

102001–102100 

|-bgcolor=#d6d6d6
| 102001 ||  || — || September 7, 1999 || Socorro || LINEAR || — || align=right | 4.8 km || 
|-id=002 bgcolor=#fefefe
| 102002 ||  || — || September 7, 1999 || Socorro || LINEAR || V || align=right | 1.3 km || 
|-id=003 bgcolor=#fefefe
| 102003 ||  || — || September 7, 1999 || Socorro || LINEAR || V || align=right | 1.6 km || 
|-id=004 bgcolor=#fefefe
| 102004 ||  || — || September 7, 1999 || Socorro || LINEAR || — || align=right | 3.0 km || 
|-id=005 bgcolor=#fefefe
| 102005 ||  || — || September 7, 1999 || Socorro || LINEAR || — || align=right | 1.6 km || 
|-id=006 bgcolor=#fefefe
| 102006 ||  || — || September 7, 1999 || Socorro || LINEAR || FLO || align=right | 1.2 km || 
|-id=007 bgcolor=#fefefe
| 102007 ||  || — || September 7, 1999 || Socorro || LINEAR || FLO || align=right | 1.7 km || 
|-id=008 bgcolor=#E9E9E9
| 102008 ||  || — || September 7, 1999 || Socorro || LINEAR || — || align=right | 1.8 km || 
|-id=009 bgcolor=#d6d6d6
| 102009 ||  || — || September 7, 1999 || Socorro || LINEAR || HYG || align=right | 5.1 km || 
|-id=010 bgcolor=#E9E9E9
| 102010 ||  || — || September 7, 1999 || Socorro || LINEAR || — || align=right | 1.9 km || 
|-id=011 bgcolor=#fefefe
| 102011 ||  || — || September 7, 1999 || Socorro || LINEAR || — || align=right | 2.0 km || 
|-id=012 bgcolor=#fefefe
| 102012 ||  || — || September 7, 1999 || Socorro || LINEAR || FLO || align=right | 1.5 km || 
|-id=013 bgcolor=#fefefe
| 102013 ||  || — || September 7, 1999 || Socorro || LINEAR || — || align=right | 1.8 km || 
|-id=014 bgcolor=#fefefe
| 102014 ||  || — || September 7, 1999 || Socorro || LINEAR || V || align=right | 1.2 km || 
|-id=015 bgcolor=#fefefe
| 102015 ||  || — || September 7, 1999 || Socorro || LINEAR || — || align=right | 1.2 km || 
|-id=016 bgcolor=#fefefe
| 102016 ||  || — || September 7, 1999 || Socorro || LINEAR || FLO || align=right | 1.4 km || 
|-id=017 bgcolor=#fefefe
| 102017 ||  || — || September 7, 1999 || Socorro || LINEAR || — || align=right | 1.5 km || 
|-id=018 bgcolor=#d6d6d6
| 102018 ||  || — || September 7, 1999 || Socorro || LINEAR || HYG || align=right | 5.7 km || 
|-id=019 bgcolor=#fefefe
| 102019 ||  || — || September 7, 1999 || Socorro || LINEAR || — || align=right | 1.9 km || 
|-id=020 bgcolor=#fefefe
| 102020 ||  || — || September 7, 1999 || Socorro || LINEAR || — || align=right | 3.1 km || 
|-id=021 bgcolor=#fefefe
| 102021 ||  || — || September 7, 1999 || Socorro || LINEAR || — || align=right | 3.1 km || 
|-id=022 bgcolor=#fefefe
| 102022 ||  || — || September 7, 1999 || Socorro || LINEAR || SUL || align=right | 5.3 km || 
|-id=023 bgcolor=#fefefe
| 102023 ||  || — || September 7, 1999 || Socorro || LINEAR || — || align=right | 1.6 km || 
|-id=024 bgcolor=#fefefe
| 102024 ||  || — || September 7, 1999 || Socorro || LINEAR || — || align=right | 1.4 km || 
|-id=025 bgcolor=#fefefe
| 102025 ||  || — || September 7, 1999 || Socorro || LINEAR || V || align=right | 1.0 km || 
|-id=026 bgcolor=#fefefe
| 102026 ||  || — || September 7, 1999 || Socorro || LINEAR || MAS || align=right | 1.4 km || 
|-id=027 bgcolor=#fefefe
| 102027 ||  || — || September 7, 1999 || Socorro || LINEAR || — || align=right | 3.3 km || 
|-id=028 bgcolor=#fefefe
| 102028 ||  || — || September 7, 1999 || Socorro || LINEAR || MAS || align=right | 1.3 km || 
|-id=029 bgcolor=#fefefe
| 102029 ||  || — || September 8, 1999 || Socorro || LINEAR || — || align=right | 1.6 km || 
|-id=030 bgcolor=#fefefe
| 102030 ||  || — || September 8, 1999 || Socorro || LINEAR || V || align=right | 1.3 km || 
|-id=031 bgcolor=#fefefe
| 102031 ||  || — || September 8, 1999 || Socorro || LINEAR || FLO || align=right | 1.5 km || 
|-id=032 bgcolor=#fefefe
| 102032 ||  || — || September 8, 1999 || Socorro || LINEAR || — || align=right | 2.3 km || 
|-id=033 bgcolor=#d6d6d6
| 102033 ||  || — || September 8, 1999 || Socorro || LINEAR || — || align=right | 8.5 km || 
|-id=034 bgcolor=#d6d6d6
| 102034 ||  || — || September 8, 1999 || Socorro || LINEAR || 7:4 || align=right | 8.2 km || 
|-id=035 bgcolor=#d6d6d6
| 102035 ||  || — || September 8, 1999 || Socorro || LINEAR || — || align=right | 3.4 km || 
|-id=036 bgcolor=#fefefe
| 102036 ||  || — || September 8, 1999 || Socorro || LINEAR || — || align=right | 1.5 km || 
|-id=037 bgcolor=#fefefe
| 102037 ||  || — || September 8, 1999 || Socorro || LINEAR || FLO || align=right | 1.4 km || 
|-id=038 bgcolor=#fefefe
| 102038 ||  || — || September 8, 1999 || Socorro || LINEAR || V || align=right | 1.3 km || 
|-id=039 bgcolor=#fefefe
| 102039 ||  || — || September 8, 1999 || Socorro || LINEAR || — || align=right | 4.4 km || 
|-id=040 bgcolor=#d6d6d6
| 102040 ||  || — || September 9, 1999 || Socorro || LINEAR || — || align=right | 9.6 km || 
|-id=041 bgcolor=#fefefe
| 102041 ||  || — || September 9, 1999 || Socorro || LINEAR || FLO || align=right | 1.3 km || 
|-id=042 bgcolor=#fefefe
| 102042 ||  || — || September 9, 1999 || Socorro || LINEAR || — || align=right | 1.8 km || 
|-id=043 bgcolor=#fefefe
| 102043 ||  || — || September 9, 1999 || Socorro || LINEAR || V || align=right | 1.3 km || 
|-id=044 bgcolor=#fefefe
| 102044 ||  || — || September 9, 1999 || Socorro || LINEAR || FLO || align=right | 1.4 km || 
|-id=045 bgcolor=#d6d6d6
| 102045 ||  || — || September 9, 1999 || Socorro || LINEAR || TIR || align=right | 3.4 km || 
|-id=046 bgcolor=#fefefe
| 102046 ||  || — || September 9, 1999 || Socorro || LINEAR || — || align=right | 1.5 km || 
|-id=047 bgcolor=#d6d6d6
| 102047 ||  || — || September 9, 1999 || Socorro || LINEAR || — || align=right | 4.1 km || 
|-id=048 bgcolor=#fefefe
| 102048 ||  || — || September 13, 1999 || Kitt Peak || Spacewatch || — || align=right | 1.3 km || 
|-id=049 bgcolor=#d6d6d6
| 102049 ||  || — || September 9, 1999 || Socorro || LINEAR || — || align=right | 5.2 km || 
|-id=050 bgcolor=#fefefe
| 102050 ||  || — || September 9, 1999 || Socorro || LINEAR || V || align=right | 1.5 km || 
|-id=051 bgcolor=#E9E9E9
| 102051 ||  || — || September 9, 1999 || Socorro || LINEAR || — || align=right | 2.7 km || 
|-id=052 bgcolor=#d6d6d6
| 102052 ||  || — || September 9, 1999 || Socorro || LINEAR || THM || align=right | 4.6 km || 
|-id=053 bgcolor=#fefefe
| 102053 ||  || — || September 9, 1999 || Socorro || LINEAR || — || align=right | 1.4 km || 
|-id=054 bgcolor=#d6d6d6
| 102054 ||  || — || September 9, 1999 || Socorro || LINEAR || — || align=right | 7.2 km || 
|-id=055 bgcolor=#fefefe
| 102055 ||  || — || September 9, 1999 || Socorro || LINEAR || FLO || align=right | 2.9 km || 
|-id=056 bgcolor=#E9E9E9
| 102056 ||  || — || September 9, 1999 || Socorro || LINEAR || — || align=right | 2.4 km || 
|-id=057 bgcolor=#fefefe
| 102057 ||  || — || September 9, 1999 || Socorro || LINEAR || — || align=right | 1.8 km || 
|-id=058 bgcolor=#E9E9E9
| 102058 ||  || — || September 9, 1999 || Socorro || LINEAR || — || align=right | 3.6 km || 
|-id=059 bgcolor=#fefefe
| 102059 ||  || — || September 9, 1999 || Socorro || LINEAR || — || align=right | 1.4 km || 
|-id=060 bgcolor=#fefefe
| 102060 ||  || — || September 9, 1999 || Socorro || LINEAR || — || align=right | 1.9 km || 
|-id=061 bgcolor=#E9E9E9
| 102061 ||  || — || September 9, 1999 || Socorro || LINEAR || — || align=right | 2.9 km || 
|-id=062 bgcolor=#d6d6d6
| 102062 ||  || — || September 9, 1999 || Socorro || LINEAR || — || align=right | 8.8 km || 
|-id=063 bgcolor=#d6d6d6
| 102063 ||  || — || September 9, 1999 || Socorro || LINEAR || — || align=right | 7.9 km || 
|-id=064 bgcolor=#d6d6d6
| 102064 ||  || — || September 9, 1999 || Socorro || LINEAR || — || align=right | 5.4 km || 
|-id=065 bgcolor=#fefefe
| 102065 ||  || — || September 9, 1999 || Socorro || LINEAR || — || align=right | 1.6 km || 
|-id=066 bgcolor=#fefefe
| 102066 ||  || — || September 9, 1999 || Socorro || LINEAR || FLO || align=right | 1.4 km || 
|-id=067 bgcolor=#E9E9E9
| 102067 ||  || — || September 9, 1999 || Socorro || LINEAR || — || align=right | 2.2 km || 
|-id=068 bgcolor=#fefefe
| 102068 ||  || — || September 9, 1999 || Socorro || LINEAR || FLO || align=right | 1.6 km || 
|-id=069 bgcolor=#fefefe
| 102069 ||  || — || September 9, 1999 || Socorro || LINEAR || NYS || align=right | 1.2 km || 
|-id=070 bgcolor=#fefefe
| 102070 ||  || — || September 9, 1999 || Socorro || LINEAR || NYS || align=right | 1.2 km || 
|-id=071 bgcolor=#fefefe
| 102071 ||  || — || September 9, 1999 || Socorro || LINEAR || — || align=right | 1.6 km || 
|-id=072 bgcolor=#d6d6d6
| 102072 ||  || — || September 9, 1999 || Socorro || LINEAR || — || align=right | 8.9 km || 
|-id=073 bgcolor=#fefefe
| 102073 ||  || — || September 9, 1999 || Socorro || LINEAR || — || align=right | 1.8 km || 
|-id=074 bgcolor=#FA8072
| 102074 ||  || — || September 9, 1999 || Socorro || LINEAR || — || align=right | 3.0 km || 
|-id=075 bgcolor=#fefefe
| 102075 ||  || — || September 9, 1999 || Socorro || LINEAR || V || align=right | 1.5 km || 
|-id=076 bgcolor=#fefefe
| 102076 ||  || — || September 9, 1999 || Socorro || LINEAR || FLO || align=right | 1.5 km || 
|-id=077 bgcolor=#fefefe
| 102077 ||  || — || September 9, 1999 || Socorro || LINEAR || FLO || align=right | 1.3 km || 
|-id=078 bgcolor=#d6d6d6
| 102078 ||  || — || September 9, 1999 || Socorro || LINEAR || — || align=right | 7.3 km || 
|-id=079 bgcolor=#fefefe
| 102079 ||  || — || September 9, 1999 || Socorro || LINEAR || — || align=right | 1.9 km || 
|-id=080 bgcolor=#fefefe
| 102080 ||  || — || September 9, 1999 || Socorro || LINEAR || V || align=right | 1.4 km || 
|-id=081 bgcolor=#fefefe
| 102081 ||  || — || September 9, 1999 || Socorro || LINEAR || — || align=right | 1.8 km || 
|-id=082 bgcolor=#d6d6d6
| 102082 ||  || — || September 9, 1999 || Socorro || LINEAR || — || align=right | 6.4 km || 
|-id=083 bgcolor=#fefefe
| 102083 ||  || — || September 9, 1999 || Socorro || LINEAR || — || align=right | 2.5 km || 
|-id=084 bgcolor=#d6d6d6
| 102084 ||  || — || September 9, 1999 || Socorro || LINEAR || HYG || align=right | 5.2 km || 
|-id=085 bgcolor=#d6d6d6
| 102085 ||  || — || September 9, 1999 || Socorro || LINEAR || — || align=right | 7.4 km || 
|-id=086 bgcolor=#fefefe
| 102086 ||  || — || September 9, 1999 || Socorro || LINEAR || NYS || align=right | 1.6 km || 
|-id=087 bgcolor=#d6d6d6
| 102087 ||  || — || September 9, 1999 || Socorro || LINEAR || — || align=right | 3.2 km || 
|-id=088 bgcolor=#fefefe
| 102088 ||  || — || September 9, 1999 || Socorro || LINEAR || — || align=right | 1.5 km || 
|-id=089 bgcolor=#fefefe
| 102089 ||  || — || September 9, 1999 || Socorro || LINEAR || — || align=right | 3.2 km || 
|-id=090 bgcolor=#fefefe
| 102090 ||  || — || September 9, 1999 || Socorro || LINEAR || — || align=right | 2.4 km || 
|-id=091 bgcolor=#fefefe
| 102091 ||  || — || September 9, 1999 || Socorro || LINEAR || NYS || align=right | 1.1 km || 
|-id=092 bgcolor=#d6d6d6
| 102092 ||  || — || September 9, 1999 || Socorro || LINEAR || — || align=right | 6.4 km || 
|-id=093 bgcolor=#d6d6d6
| 102093 ||  || — || September 9, 1999 || Socorro || LINEAR || — || align=right | 7.4 km || 
|-id=094 bgcolor=#d6d6d6
| 102094 ||  || — || September 9, 1999 || Socorro || LINEAR || HYG || align=right | 6.3 km || 
|-id=095 bgcolor=#fefefe
| 102095 ||  || — || September 9, 1999 || Socorro || LINEAR || — || align=right | 2.7 km || 
|-id=096 bgcolor=#fefefe
| 102096 ||  || — || September 9, 1999 || Socorro || LINEAR || NYS || align=right | 1.2 km || 
|-id=097 bgcolor=#fefefe
| 102097 ||  || — || September 9, 1999 || Socorro || LINEAR || — || align=right | 2.1 km || 
|-id=098 bgcolor=#fefefe
| 102098 ||  || — || September 9, 1999 || Socorro || LINEAR || NYS || align=right | 1.3 km || 
|-id=099 bgcolor=#fefefe
| 102099 ||  || — || September 9, 1999 || Socorro || LINEAR || MAS || align=right | 1.5 km || 
|-id=100 bgcolor=#E9E9E9
| 102100 ||  || — || September 9, 1999 || Socorro || LINEAR || — || align=right | 2.6 km || 
|}

102101–102200 

|-bgcolor=#fefefe
| 102101 ||  || — || September 9, 1999 || Socorro || LINEAR || — || align=right | 1.8 km || 
|-id=102 bgcolor=#fefefe
| 102102 ||  || — || September 9, 1999 || Socorro || LINEAR || — || align=right | 1.6 km || 
|-id=103 bgcolor=#fefefe
| 102103 ||  || — || September 9, 1999 || Socorro || LINEAR || V || align=right | 1.1 km || 
|-id=104 bgcolor=#fefefe
| 102104 ||  || — || September 9, 1999 || Socorro || LINEAR || NYS || align=right | 1.0 km || 
|-id=105 bgcolor=#d6d6d6
| 102105 ||  || — || September 9, 1999 || Socorro || LINEAR || — || align=right | 7.1 km || 
|-id=106 bgcolor=#E9E9E9
| 102106 ||  || — || September 9, 1999 || Socorro || LINEAR || — || align=right | 2.2 km || 
|-id=107 bgcolor=#fefefe
| 102107 ||  || — || September 9, 1999 || Socorro || LINEAR || — || align=right | 2.1 km || 
|-id=108 bgcolor=#fefefe
| 102108 ||  || — || September 9, 1999 || Socorro || LINEAR || MAS || align=right | 2.4 km || 
|-id=109 bgcolor=#FA8072
| 102109 ||  || — || September 9, 1999 || Socorro || LINEAR || — || align=right | 1.2 km || 
|-id=110 bgcolor=#d6d6d6
| 102110 ||  || — || September 9, 1999 || Socorro || LINEAR || — || align=right | 7.4 km || 
|-id=111 bgcolor=#fefefe
| 102111 ||  || — || September 9, 1999 || Socorro || LINEAR || — || align=right | 2.3 km || 
|-id=112 bgcolor=#fefefe
| 102112 ||  || — || September 9, 1999 || Socorro || LINEAR || V || align=right | 1.1 km || 
|-id=113 bgcolor=#fefefe
| 102113 ||  || — || September 9, 1999 || Socorro || LINEAR || — || align=right | 2.6 km || 
|-id=114 bgcolor=#d6d6d6
| 102114 ||  || — || September 9, 1999 || Socorro || LINEAR || — || align=right | 9.0 km || 
|-id=115 bgcolor=#fefefe
| 102115 ||  || — || September 9, 1999 || Socorro || LINEAR || — || align=right | 2.4 km || 
|-id=116 bgcolor=#fefefe
| 102116 ||  || — || September 9, 1999 || Socorro || LINEAR || NYS || align=right | 1.4 km || 
|-id=117 bgcolor=#E9E9E9
| 102117 ||  || — || September 9, 1999 || Socorro || LINEAR || — || align=right | 1.5 km || 
|-id=118 bgcolor=#fefefe
| 102118 ||  || — || September 9, 1999 || Socorro || LINEAR || — || align=right | 1.8 km || 
|-id=119 bgcolor=#fefefe
| 102119 ||  || — || September 9, 1999 || Socorro || LINEAR || — || align=right | 1.6 km || 
|-id=120 bgcolor=#fefefe
| 102120 ||  || — || September 9, 1999 || Socorro || LINEAR || — || align=right | 6.2 km || 
|-id=121 bgcolor=#fefefe
| 102121 ||  || — || September 9, 1999 || Socorro || LINEAR || MAS || align=right | 1.4 km || 
|-id=122 bgcolor=#fefefe
| 102122 ||  || — || September 9, 1999 || Socorro || LINEAR || — || align=right | 1.9 km || 
|-id=123 bgcolor=#d6d6d6
| 102123 ||  || — || September 9, 1999 || Socorro || LINEAR || — || align=right | 7.0 km || 
|-id=124 bgcolor=#E9E9E9
| 102124 ||  || — || September 9, 1999 || Socorro || LINEAR || — || align=right | 1.8 km || 
|-id=125 bgcolor=#fefefe
| 102125 ||  || — || September 9, 1999 || Socorro || LINEAR || FLO || align=right | 1.1 km || 
|-id=126 bgcolor=#fefefe
| 102126 ||  || — || September 9, 1999 || Socorro || LINEAR || FLO || align=right | 1.2 km || 
|-id=127 bgcolor=#fefefe
| 102127 ||  || — || September 9, 1999 || Socorro || LINEAR || — || align=right | 1.6 km || 
|-id=128 bgcolor=#E9E9E9
| 102128 ||  || — || September 9, 1999 || Socorro || LINEAR || — || align=right | 1.8 km || 
|-id=129 bgcolor=#fefefe
| 102129 ||  || — || September 9, 1999 || Socorro || LINEAR || — || align=right | 2.0 km || 
|-id=130 bgcolor=#fefefe
| 102130 ||  || — || September 9, 1999 || Socorro || LINEAR || — || align=right | 2.4 km || 
|-id=131 bgcolor=#fefefe
| 102131 ||  || — || September 9, 1999 || Socorro || LINEAR || — || align=right | 1.6 km || 
|-id=132 bgcolor=#fefefe
| 102132 ||  || — || September 9, 1999 || Socorro || LINEAR || — || align=right | 2.1 km || 
|-id=133 bgcolor=#fefefe
| 102133 ||  || — || September 9, 1999 || Socorro || LINEAR || — || align=right | 1.4 km || 
|-id=134 bgcolor=#fefefe
| 102134 ||  || — || September 9, 1999 || Socorro || LINEAR || MAS || align=right | 1.4 km || 
|-id=135 bgcolor=#fefefe
| 102135 ||  || — || September 9, 1999 || Socorro || LINEAR || NYS || align=right | 1.2 km || 
|-id=136 bgcolor=#fefefe
| 102136 ||  || — || September 9, 1999 || Socorro || LINEAR || V || align=right | 1.8 km || 
|-id=137 bgcolor=#fefefe
| 102137 ||  || — || September 9, 1999 || Socorro || LINEAR || — || align=right | 1.7 km || 
|-id=138 bgcolor=#fefefe
| 102138 ||  || — || September 9, 1999 || Socorro || LINEAR || NYS || align=right | 1.6 km || 
|-id=139 bgcolor=#fefefe
| 102139 ||  || — || September 9, 1999 || Socorro || LINEAR || V || align=right | 1.4 km || 
|-id=140 bgcolor=#fefefe
| 102140 ||  || — || September 9, 1999 || Socorro || LINEAR || FLO || align=right | 1.7 km || 
|-id=141 bgcolor=#fefefe
| 102141 ||  || — || September 9, 1999 || Socorro || LINEAR || — || align=right | 2.6 km || 
|-id=142 bgcolor=#E9E9E9
| 102142 ||  || — || September 9, 1999 || Socorro || LINEAR || — || align=right | 1.6 km || 
|-id=143 bgcolor=#fefefe
| 102143 ||  || — || September 9, 1999 || Socorro || LINEAR || MAS || align=right | 1.4 km || 
|-id=144 bgcolor=#fefefe
| 102144 ||  || — || September 9, 1999 || Socorro || LINEAR || — || align=right | 1.8 km || 
|-id=145 bgcolor=#E9E9E9
| 102145 ||  || — || September 9, 1999 || Socorro || LINEAR || — || align=right | 1.7 km || 
|-id=146 bgcolor=#E9E9E9
| 102146 ||  || — || September 11, 1999 || Socorro || LINEAR || — || align=right | 1.6 km || 
|-id=147 bgcolor=#fefefe
| 102147 ||  || — || September 13, 1999 || Socorro || LINEAR || — || align=right | 2.0 km || 
|-id=148 bgcolor=#fefefe
| 102148 ||  || — || September 8, 1999 || Socorro || LINEAR || — || align=right | 3.5 km || 
|-id=149 bgcolor=#fefefe
| 102149 ||  || — || September 8, 1999 || Socorro || LINEAR || FLO || align=right | 1.6 km || 
|-id=150 bgcolor=#d6d6d6
| 102150 ||  || — || September 8, 1999 || Socorro || LINEAR || EUP || align=right | 11 km || 
|-id=151 bgcolor=#fefefe
| 102151 ||  || — || September 8, 1999 || Socorro || LINEAR || FLO || align=right | 1.4 km || 
|-id=152 bgcolor=#d6d6d6
| 102152 ||  || — || September 8, 1999 || Socorro || LINEAR || — || align=right | 8.2 km || 
|-id=153 bgcolor=#fefefe
| 102153 ||  || — || September 8, 1999 || Socorro || LINEAR || — || align=right | 1.7 km || 
|-id=154 bgcolor=#fefefe
| 102154 ||  || — || September 8, 1999 || Socorro || LINEAR || — || align=right | 2.9 km || 
|-id=155 bgcolor=#fefefe
| 102155 ||  || — || September 8, 1999 || Socorro || LINEAR || — || align=right | 2.3 km || 
|-id=156 bgcolor=#E9E9E9
| 102156 ||  || — || September 8, 1999 || Socorro || LINEAR || — || align=right | 6.2 km || 
|-id=157 bgcolor=#d6d6d6
| 102157 ||  || — || September 8, 1999 || Socorro || LINEAR || — || align=right | 4.5 km || 
|-id=158 bgcolor=#fefefe
| 102158 ||  || — || September 8, 1999 || Socorro || LINEAR || — || align=right | 2.2 km || 
|-id=159 bgcolor=#fefefe
| 102159 ||  || — || September 13, 1999 || Kitt Peak || Spacewatch || — || align=right | 1.5 km || 
|-id=160 bgcolor=#fefefe
| 102160 ||  || — || September 4, 1999 || Anderson Mesa || LONEOS || — || align=right | 2.2 km || 
|-id=161 bgcolor=#fefefe
| 102161 ||  || — || September 3, 1999 || Anderson Mesa || LONEOS || — || align=right | 3.0 km || 
|-id=162 bgcolor=#fefefe
| 102162 ||  || — || September 5, 1999 || Kitt Peak || Spacewatch || MAS || align=right | 1.2 km || 
|-id=163 bgcolor=#fefefe
| 102163 ||  || — || September 4, 1999 || Anderson Mesa || LONEOS || FLO || align=right | 1.6 km || 
|-id=164 bgcolor=#fefefe
| 102164 ||  || — || September 4, 1999 || Catalina || CSS || V || align=right | 1.4 km || 
|-id=165 bgcolor=#d6d6d6
| 102165 ||  || — || September 4, 1999 || Catalina || CSS || 7:4 || align=right | 9.2 km || 
|-id=166 bgcolor=#fefefe
| 102166 ||  || — || September 5, 1999 || Catalina || CSS || V || align=right | 1.4 km || 
|-id=167 bgcolor=#d6d6d6
| 102167 ||  || — || September 7, 1999 || Catalina || CSS || 7:4 || align=right | 10 km || 
|-id=168 bgcolor=#fefefe
| 102168 ||  || — || September 5, 1999 || Catalina || CSS || V || align=right | 1.2 km || 
|-id=169 bgcolor=#fefefe
| 102169 ||  || — || September 7, 1999 || Anderson Mesa || LONEOS || — || align=right | 1.2 km || 
|-id=170 bgcolor=#fefefe
| 102170 ||  || — || September 8, 1999 || Catalina || CSS || FLO || align=right | 1.8 km || 
|-id=171 bgcolor=#fefefe
| 102171 ||  || — || September 8, 1999 || Catalina || CSS || FLO || align=right | 1.1 km || 
|-id=172 bgcolor=#fefefe
| 102172 ||  || — || September 8, 1999 || Catalina || CSS || FLO || align=right | 1.8 km || 
|-id=173 bgcolor=#fefefe
| 102173 ||  || — || September 8, 1999 || Catalina || CSS || V || align=right | 1.3 km || 
|-id=174 bgcolor=#E9E9E9
| 102174 ||  || — || September 8, 1999 || Catalina || CSS || — || align=right | 1.9 km || 
|-id=175 bgcolor=#fefefe
| 102175 ||  || — || September 8, 1999 || Catalina || CSS || — || align=right | 1.2 km || 
|-id=176 bgcolor=#fefefe
| 102176 ||  || — || September 8, 1999 || Catalina || CSS || — || align=right | 2.1 km || 
|-id=177 bgcolor=#fefefe
| 102177 ||  || — || September 8, 1999 || Catalina || CSS || V || align=right | 2.3 km || 
|-id=178 bgcolor=#fefefe
| 102178 ||  || — || September 8, 1999 || Catalina || CSS || — || align=right | 1.8 km || 
|-id=179 bgcolor=#fefefe
| 102179 ||  || — || September 8, 1999 || Catalina || CSS || — || align=right | 4.1 km || 
|-id=180 bgcolor=#fefefe
| 102180 ||  || — || September 8, 1999 || Catalina || CSS || — || align=right | 2.0 km || 
|-id=181 bgcolor=#E9E9E9
| 102181 ||  || — || September 11, 1999 || Anderson Mesa || LONEOS || EUN || align=right | 2.6 km || 
|-id=182 bgcolor=#E9E9E9
| 102182 ||  || — || September 14, 1999 || Catalina || CSS || — || align=right | 4.5 km || 
|-id=183 bgcolor=#fefefe
| 102183 ||  || — || September 4, 1999 || Anderson Mesa || LONEOS || FLO || align=right | 1.2 km || 
|-id=184 bgcolor=#fefefe
| 102184 ||  || — || September 4, 1999 || Anderson Mesa || LONEOS || V || align=right | 1.3 km || 
|-id=185 bgcolor=#fefefe
| 102185 ||  || — || September 7, 1999 || Socorro || LINEAR || FLO || align=right | 1.1 km || 
|-id=186 bgcolor=#fefefe
| 102186 ||  || — || September 5, 1999 || Kitt Peak || Spacewatch || MAS || align=right data-sort-value="0.90" | 900 m || 
|-id=187 bgcolor=#fefefe
| 102187 ||  || — || September 9, 1999 || Socorro || LINEAR || V || align=right | 1.1 km || 
|-id=188 bgcolor=#fefefe
| 102188 ||  || — || September 4, 1999 || Anderson Mesa || LONEOS || — || align=right | 1.5 km || 
|-id=189 bgcolor=#d6d6d6
| 102189 ||  || — || September 18, 1999 || Socorro || LINEAR || Tj (2.98) || align=right | 8.6 km || 
|-id=190 bgcolor=#E9E9E9
| 102190 ||  || — || September 27, 1999 || Socorro || LINEAR || — || align=right | 8.3 km || 
|-id=191 bgcolor=#fefefe
| 102191 ||  || — || September 29, 1999 || Višnjan Observatory || K. Korlević || — || align=right | 1.6 km || 
|-id=192 bgcolor=#fefefe
| 102192 ||  || — || September 30, 1999 || Socorro || LINEAR || PHO || align=right | 2.4 km || 
|-id=193 bgcolor=#E9E9E9
| 102193 ||  || — || September 30, 1999 || Socorro || LINEAR || — || align=right | 2.1 km || 
|-id=194 bgcolor=#fefefe
| 102194 ||  || — || September 29, 1999 || Socorro || LINEAR || — || align=right | 2.2 km || 
|-id=195 bgcolor=#fefefe
| 102195 ||  || — || September 30, 1999 || Catalina || CSS || V || align=right | 1.6 km || 
|-id=196 bgcolor=#fefefe
| 102196 ||  || — || September 30, 1999 || Catalina || CSS || — || align=right | 3.0 km || 
|-id=197 bgcolor=#fefefe
| 102197 ||  || — || September 30, 1999 || Catalina || CSS || — || align=right | 2.1 km || 
|-id=198 bgcolor=#fefefe
| 102198 ||  || — || September 30, 1999 || Catalina || CSS || V || align=right | 1.6 km || 
|-id=199 bgcolor=#E9E9E9
| 102199 ||  || — || September 30, 1999 || Socorro || LINEAR || JUN || align=right | 3.0 km || 
|-id=200 bgcolor=#fefefe
| 102200 ||  || — || September 29, 1999 || Catalina || CSS || — || align=right | 1.6 km || 
|}

102201–102300 

|-bgcolor=#E9E9E9
| 102201 ||  || — || September 29, 1999 || Catalina || CSS || — || align=right | 3.2 km || 
|-id=202 bgcolor=#E9E9E9
| 102202 ||  || — || September 30, 1999 || Catalina || CSS || — || align=right | 4.4 km || 
|-id=203 bgcolor=#fefefe
| 102203 ||  || — || September 30, 1999 || Socorro || LINEAR || — || align=right | 1.9 km || 
|-id=204 bgcolor=#E9E9E9
| 102204 ||  || — || September 30, 1999 || Socorro || LINEAR || — || align=right | 5.1 km || 
|-id=205 bgcolor=#fefefe
| 102205 ||  || — || September 30, 1999 || Socorro || LINEAR || — || align=right | 2.1 km || 
|-id=206 bgcolor=#fefefe
| 102206 ||  || — || September 30, 1999 || Socorro || LINEAR || — || align=right | 1.7 km || 
|-id=207 bgcolor=#E9E9E9
| 102207 ||  || — || September 30, 1999 || Kitt Peak || Spacewatch || — || align=right | 1.3 km || 
|-id=208 bgcolor=#E9E9E9
| 102208 ||  || — || September 21, 1999 || Anderson Mesa || LONEOS || — || align=right | 1.9 km || 
|-id=209 bgcolor=#E9E9E9
| 102209 ||  || — || September 30, 1999 || Catalina || CSS || — || align=right | 1.8 km || 
|-id=210 bgcolor=#fefefe
| 102210 ||  || — || September 29, 1999 || Catalina || CSS || — || align=right | 2.5 km || 
|-id=211 bgcolor=#fefefe
| 102211 Angelofaggiano || 1999 TQ ||  || October 1, 1999 || Campo Catino || M. Di Sora, F. Mallia || — || align=right | 1.7 km || 
|-id=212 bgcolor=#fefefe
| 102212 ||  || — || October 1, 1999 || Višnjan Observatory || K. Korlević || NYS || align=right | 1.2 km || 
|-id=213 bgcolor=#E9E9E9
| 102213 ||  || — || October 1, 1999 || Višnjan Observatory || K. Korlević || — || align=right | 2.5 km || 
|-id=214 bgcolor=#fefefe
| 102214 ||  || — || October 1, 1999 || Višnjan Observatory || K. Korlević || — || align=right | 4.1 km || 
|-id=215 bgcolor=#fefefe
| 102215 ||  || — || October 2, 1999 || Ondřejov || L. Kotková || FLO || align=right | 1.3 km || 
|-id=216 bgcolor=#d6d6d6
| 102216 ||  || — || October 3, 1999 || Nacogdoches || B. D. McCormack, D. W. Carona || LIX || align=right | 7.6 km || 
|-id=217 bgcolor=#E9E9E9
| 102217 ||  || — || October 4, 1999 || Socorro || LINEAR || GER || align=right | 3.4 km || 
|-id=218 bgcolor=#d6d6d6
| 102218 ||  || — || October 5, 1999 || Farpoint || G. Bell, G. Hug || 7:4 || align=right | 8.8 km || 
|-id=219 bgcolor=#fefefe
| 102219 ||  || — || October 6, 1999 || Farpoint || G. Bell, G. Hug || — || align=right | 1.4 km || 
|-id=220 bgcolor=#fefefe
| 102220 ||  || — || October 6, 1999 || Višnjan Observatory || K. Korlević, M. Jurić || NYS || align=right | 1.6 km || 
|-id=221 bgcolor=#fefefe
| 102221 ||  || — || October 7, 1999 || Višnjan Observatory || K. Korlević, M. Jurić || — || align=right | 1.6 km || 
|-id=222 bgcolor=#fefefe
| 102222 ||  || — || October 8, 1999 || Črni Vrh || Črni Vrh || NYS || align=right | 1.4 km || 
|-id=223 bgcolor=#E9E9E9
| 102223 ||  || — || October 10, 1999 || Gnosca || S. Sposetti || — || align=right | 3.2 km || 
|-id=224 bgcolor=#fefefe
| 102224 Raffaellolena ||  ||  || October 10, 1999 || Gnosca || S. Sposetti || NYS || align=right | 1.5 km || 
|-id=225 bgcolor=#fefefe
| 102225 ||  || — || October 10, 1999 || Fountain Hills || C. W. Juels || — || align=right | 1.8 km || 
|-id=226 bgcolor=#fefefe
| 102226 ||  || — || October 8, 1999 || Hudson || S. Brady || — || align=right | 1.5 km || 
|-id=227 bgcolor=#E9E9E9
| 102227 ||  || — || October 13, 1999 || Prescott || P. G. Comba || RAF || align=right | 1.7 km || 
|-id=228 bgcolor=#E9E9E9
| 102228 ||  || — || October 12, 1999 || Ondřejov || P. Pravec, P. Kušnirák || — || align=right | 4.7 km || 
|-id=229 bgcolor=#fefefe
| 102229 ||  || — || October 15, 1999 || Ondřejov || P. Pravec, P. Kušnirák || FLO || align=right | 1.5 km || 
|-id=230 bgcolor=#d6d6d6
| 102230 ||  || — || October 10, 1999 || Xinglong || SCAP || — || align=right | 4.9 km || 
|-id=231 bgcolor=#fefefe
| 102231 ||  || — || October 14, 1999 || Xinglong || SCAP || — || align=right | 1.6 km || 
|-id=232 bgcolor=#FA8072
| 102232 ||  || — || October 12, 1999 || Črni Vrh || Črni Vrh || — || align=right | 2.3 km || 
|-id=233 bgcolor=#E9E9E9
| 102233 ||  || — || October 10, 1999 || Calgary || G. W. Billings || — || align=right | 2.4 km || 
|-id=234 bgcolor=#fefefe
| 102234 Olivebyrne ||  ||  || October 5, 1999 || Goodricke-Pigott || R. A. Tucker || NYS || align=right | 1.2 km || 
|-id=235 bgcolor=#fefefe
| 102235 ||  || — || October 13, 1999 || Bergisch Gladbach || W. Bickel || V || align=right | 1.3 km || 
|-id=236 bgcolor=#fefefe
| 102236 ||  || — || October 2, 1999 || Kitt Peak || Spacewatch || — || align=right | 1.6 km || 
|-id=237 bgcolor=#d6d6d6
| 102237 ||  || — || October 2, 1999 || Kitt Peak || Spacewatch || EOS || align=right | 3.8 km || 
|-id=238 bgcolor=#fefefe
| 102238 ||  || — || October 3, 1999 || Kitt Peak || Spacewatch || NYS || align=right | 1.2 km || 
|-id=239 bgcolor=#E9E9E9
| 102239 ||  || — || October 3, 1999 || Kitt Peak || Spacewatch || — || align=right | 5.3 km || 
|-id=240 bgcolor=#fefefe
| 102240 ||  || — || October 3, 1999 || Kitt Peak || Spacewatch || NYS || align=right | 1.3 km || 
|-id=241 bgcolor=#fefefe
| 102241 ||  || — || October 3, 1999 || Kitt Peak || Spacewatch || NYS || align=right | 3.1 km || 
|-id=242 bgcolor=#fefefe
| 102242 ||  || — || October 3, 1999 || Socorro || LINEAR || — || align=right | 1.7 km || 
|-id=243 bgcolor=#fefefe
| 102243 ||  || — || October 3, 1999 || Socorro || LINEAR || — || align=right | 2.7 km || 
|-id=244 bgcolor=#fefefe
| 102244 ||  || — || October 3, 1999 || Socorro || LINEAR || — || align=right | 1.8 km || 
|-id=245 bgcolor=#fefefe
| 102245 ||  || — || October 3, 1999 || Socorro || LINEAR || — || align=right | 2.2 km || 
|-id=246 bgcolor=#fefefe
| 102246 ||  || — || October 3, 1999 || Socorro || LINEAR || NYS || align=right | 1.4 km || 
|-id=247 bgcolor=#fefefe
| 102247 ||  || — || October 3, 1999 || Socorro || LINEAR || — || align=right | 1.4 km || 
|-id=248 bgcolor=#fefefe
| 102248 ||  || — || October 3, 1999 || Socorro || LINEAR || — || align=right | 2.0 km || 
|-id=249 bgcolor=#E9E9E9
| 102249 ||  || — || October 3, 1999 || Socorro || LINEAR || EUN || align=right | 2.9 km || 
|-id=250 bgcolor=#E9E9E9
| 102250 ||  || — || October 3, 1999 || Socorro || LINEAR || — || align=right | 3.2 km || 
|-id=251 bgcolor=#fefefe
| 102251 ||  || — || October 3, 1999 || Socorro || LINEAR || NYS || align=right | 1.4 km || 
|-id=252 bgcolor=#fefefe
| 102252 ||  || — || October 3, 1999 || Socorro || LINEAR || NYS || align=right | 1.3 km || 
|-id=253 bgcolor=#fefefe
| 102253 ||  || — || October 3, 1999 || Socorro || LINEAR || NYS || align=right | 1.3 km || 
|-id=254 bgcolor=#fefefe
| 102254 ||  || — || October 4, 1999 || Socorro || LINEAR || NYS || align=right | 1.2 km || 
|-id=255 bgcolor=#fefefe
| 102255 ||  || — || October 4, 1999 || Socorro || LINEAR || — || align=right | 1.5 km || 
|-id=256 bgcolor=#fefefe
| 102256 ||  || — || October 4, 1999 || Socorro || LINEAR || NYS || align=right | 1.3 km || 
|-id=257 bgcolor=#fefefe
| 102257 ||  || — || October 4, 1999 || Socorro || LINEAR || NYS || align=right | 1.4 km || 
|-id=258 bgcolor=#fefefe
| 102258 ||  || — || October 4, 1999 || Socorro || LINEAR || NYS || align=right | 1.2 km || 
|-id=259 bgcolor=#fefefe
| 102259 ||  || — || October 4, 1999 || Socorro || LINEAR || — || align=right | 1.9 km || 
|-id=260 bgcolor=#fefefe
| 102260 ||  || — || October 4, 1999 || Socorro || LINEAR || V || align=right | 1.3 km || 
|-id=261 bgcolor=#E9E9E9
| 102261 ||  || — || October 1, 1999 || Catalina || CSS || — || align=right | 1.7 km || 
|-id=262 bgcolor=#fefefe
| 102262 ||  || — || October 1, 1999 || Catalina || CSS || FLO || align=right | 1.2 km || 
|-id=263 bgcolor=#fefefe
| 102263 ||  || — || October 13, 1999 || Anderson Mesa || LONEOS || — || align=right | 1.9 km || 
|-id=264 bgcolor=#fefefe
| 102264 ||  || — || October 1, 1999 || Catalina || CSS || V || align=right | 1.5 km || 
|-id=265 bgcolor=#fefefe
| 102265 ||  || — || October 1, 1999 || Catalina || CSS || V || align=right | 1.6 km || 
|-id=266 bgcolor=#fefefe
| 102266 ||  || — || October 5, 1999 || Catalina || CSS || NYS || align=right | 2.7 km || 
|-id=267 bgcolor=#E9E9E9
| 102267 ||  || — || October 5, 1999 || Catalina || CSS || — || align=right | 2.1 km || 
|-id=268 bgcolor=#fefefe
| 102268 ||  || — || October 3, 1999 || Kitt Peak || Spacewatch || — || align=right | 1.4 km || 
|-id=269 bgcolor=#fefefe
| 102269 ||  || — || October 3, 1999 || Kitt Peak || Spacewatch || — || align=right | 3.7 km || 
|-id=270 bgcolor=#fefefe
| 102270 ||  || — || October 3, 1999 || Kitt Peak || Spacewatch || — || align=right | 1.5 km || 
|-id=271 bgcolor=#fefefe
| 102271 ||  || — || October 3, 1999 || Kitt Peak || Spacewatch || — || align=right | 3.0 km || 
|-id=272 bgcolor=#d6d6d6
| 102272 ||  || — || October 4, 1999 || Kitt Peak || Spacewatch || URS || align=right | 6.7 km || 
|-id=273 bgcolor=#fefefe
| 102273 ||  || — || October 4, 1999 || Kitt Peak || Spacewatch || — || align=right | 1.9 km || 
|-id=274 bgcolor=#fefefe
| 102274 ||  || — || October 4, 1999 || Kitt Peak || Spacewatch || NYS || align=right | 1.1 km || 
|-id=275 bgcolor=#E9E9E9
| 102275 ||  || — || October 4, 1999 || Kitt Peak || Spacewatch || HEN || align=right | 3.3 km || 
|-id=276 bgcolor=#fefefe
| 102276 ||  || — || October 6, 1999 || Kitt Peak || Spacewatch || — || align=right | 1.1 km || 
|-id=277 bgcolor=#fefefe
| 102277 ||  || — || October 6, 1999 || Kitt Peak || Spacewatch || — || align=right data-sort-value="0.99" | 990 m || 
|-id=278 bgcolor=#E9E9E9
| 102278 ||  || — || October 6, 1999 || Kitt Peak || Spacewatch || — || align=right | 1.5 km || 
|-id=279 bgcolor=#fefefe
| 102279 ||  || — || October 6, 1999 || Kitt Peak || Spacewatch || — || align=right | 1.4 km || 
|-id=280 bgcolor=#E9E9E9
| 102280 ||  || — || October 6, 1999 || Kitt Peak || Spacewatch || — || align=right | 2.3 km || 
|-id=281 bgcolor=#E9E9E9
| 102281 ||  || — || October 7, 1999 || Kitt Peak || Spacewatch || — || align=right | 2.2 km || 
|-id=282 bgcolor=#fefefe
| 102282 ||  || — || October 7, 1999 || Kitt Peak || Spacewatch || NYS || align=right | 1.8 km || 
|-id=283 bgcolor=#E9E9E9
| 102283 ||  || — || October 7, 1999 || Kitt Peak || Spacewatch || — || align=right | 4.6 km || 
|-id=284 bgcolor=#E9E9E9
| 102284 ||  || — || October 7, 1999 || Kitt Peak || Spacewatch || — || align=right | 2.1 km || 
|-id=285 bgcolor=#fefefe
| 102285 ||  || — || October 7, 1999 || Kitt Peak || Spacewatch || — || align=right | 1.6 km || 
|-id=286 bgcolor=#fefefe
| 102286 ||  || — || October 8, 1999 || Kitt Peak || Spacewatch || MAS || align=right | 1.5 km || 
|-id=287 bgcolor=#fefefe
| 102287 ||  || — || October 8, 1999 || Kitt Peak || Spacewatch || — || align=right | 2.3 km || 
|-id=288 bgcolor=#E9E9E9
| 102288 ||  || — || October 9, 1999 || Kitt Peak || Spacewatch || — || align=right | 2.7 km || 
|-id=289 bgcolor=#fefefe
| 102289 ||  || — || October 9, 1999 || Kitt Peak || Spacewatch || FLO || align=right | 1.1 km || 
|-id=290 bgcolor=#fefefe
| 102290 ||  || — || October 10, 1999 || Kitt Peak || Spacewatch || — || align=right | 1.2 km || 
|-id=291 bgcolor=#fefefe
| 102291 ||  || — || October 10, 1999 || Kitt Peak || Spacewatch || MAS || align=right | 1.2 km || 
|-id=292 bgcolor=#fefefe
| 102292 ||  || — || October 10, 1999 || Kitt Peak || Spacewatch || — || align=right | 1.2 km || 
|-id=293 bgcolor=#fefefe
| 102293 ||  || — || October 11, 1999 || Kitt Peak || Spacewatch || NYS || align=right | 1.3 km || 
|-id=294 bgcolor=#fefefe
| 102294 ||  || — || October 11, 1999 || Kitt Peak || Spacewatch || NYS || align=right data-sort-value="0.99" | 990 m || 
|-id=295 bgcolor=#fefefe
| 102295 ||  || — || October 12, 1999 || Kitt Peak || Spacewatch || — || align=right | 1.7 km || 
|-id=296 bgcolor=#fefefe
| 102296 ||  || — || October 12, 1999 || Kitt Peak || Spacewatch || — || align=right | 1.7 km || 
|-id=297 bgcolor=#fefefe
| 102297 ||  || — || October 14, 1999 || Kitt Peak || Spacewatch || — || align=right | 1.9 km || 
|-id=298 bgcolor=#fefefe
| 102298 ||  || — || October 15, 1999 || Kitt Peak || Spacewatch || — || align=right | 1.4 km || 
|-id=299 bgcolor=#fefefe
| 102299 ||  || — || October 15, 1999 || Kitt Peak || Spacewatch || FLO || align=right | 1.2 km || 
|-id=300 bgcolor=#fefefe
| 102300 ||  || — || October 15, 1999 || Kitt Peak || Spacewatch || — || align=right | 1.4 km || 
|}

102301–102400 

|-bgcolor=#fefefe
| 102301 ||  || — || October 2, 1999 || Socorro || LINEAR || FLO || align=right | 1.6 km || 
|-id=302 bgcolor=#E9E9E9
| 102302 ||  || — || October 2, 1999 || Socorro || LINEAR || — || align=right | 1.8 km || 
|-id=303 bgcolor=#fefefe
| 102303 ||  || — || October 2, 1999 || Socorro || LINEAR || — || align=right | 1.8 km || 
|-id=304 bgcolor=#fefefe
| 102304 ||  || — || October 2, 1999 || Socorro || LINEAR || V || align=right | 1.3 km || 
|-id=305 bgcolor=#fefefe
| 102305 ||  || — || October 2, 1999 || Socorro || LINEAR || V || align=right | 1.6 km || 
|-id=306 bgcolor=#fefefe
| 102306 ||  || — || October 2, 1999 || Socorro || LINEAR || V || align=right | 1.9 km || 
|-id=307 bgcolor=#fefefe
| 102307 ||  || — || October 2, 1999 || Socorro || LINEAR || — || align=right | 1.5 km || 
|-id=308 bgcolor=#fefefe
| 102308 ||  || — || October 2, 1999 || Socorro || LINEAR || — || align=right | 1.8 km || 
|-id=309 bgcolor=#E9E9E9
| 102309 ||  || — || October 2, 1999 || Socorro || LINEAR || — || align=right | 2.1 km || 
|-id=310 bgcolor=#fefefe
| 102310 ||  || — || October 2, 1999 || Socorro || LINEAR || FLO || align=right | 1.4 km || 
|-id=311 bgcolor=#E9E9E9
| 102311 ||  || — || October 2, 1999 || Socorro || LINEAR || — || align=right | 2.4 km || 
|-id=312 bgcolor=#fefefe
| 102312 ||  || — || October 2, 1999 || Socorro || LINEAR || — || align=right | 7.3 km || 
|-id=313 bgcolor=#fefefe
| 102313 ||  || — || October 2, 1999 || Socorro || LINEAR || — || align=right | 3.6 km || 
|-id=314 bgcolor=#fefefe
| 102314 ||  || — || October 2, 1999 || Socorro || LINEAR || — || align=right | 3.8 km || 
|-id=315 bgcolor=#fefefe
| 102315 ||  || — || October 2, 1999 || Socorro || LINEAR || V || align=right | 1.8 km || 
|-id=316 bgcolor=#fefefe
| 102316 ||  || — || October 2, 1999 || Socorro || LINEAR || — || align=right | 1.5 km || 
|-id=317 bgcolor=#fefefe
| 102317 ||  || — || October 2, 1999 || Socorro || LINEAR || — || align=right | 2.5 km || 
|-id=318 bgcolor=#E9E9E9
| 102318 ||  || — || October 2, 1999 || Socorro || LINEAR || — || align=right | 4.2 km || 
|-id=319 bgcolor=#fefefe
| 102319 ||  || — || October 3, 1999 || Socorro || LINEAR || FLO || align=right | 1.5 km || 
|-id=320 bgcolor=#fefefe
| 102320 ||  || — || October 3, 1999 || Socorro || LINEAR || FLO || align=right | 1.5 km || 
|-id=321 bgcolor=#E9E9E9
| 102321 ||  || — || October 3, 1999 || Socorro || LINEAR || — || align=right | 2.1 km || 
|-id=322 bgcolor=#fefefe
| 102322 ||  || — || October 3, 1999 || Socorro || LINEAR || — || align=right | 1.9 km || 
|-id=323 bgcolor=#d6d6d6
| 102323 ||  || — || October 4, 1999 || Socorro || LINEAR || — || align=right | 6.9 km || 
|-id=324 bgcolor=#d6d6d6
| 102324 ||  || — || October 4, 1999 || Socorro || LINEAR || URS || align=right | 6.6 km || 
|-id=325 bgcolor=#d6d6d6
| 102325 ||  || — || October 4, 1999 || Socorro || LINEAR || — || align=right | 6.6 km || 
|-id=326 bgcolor=#E9E9E9
| 102326 ||  || — || October 4, 1999 || Socorro || LINEAR || — || align=right | 1.7 km || 
|-id=327 bgcolor=#d6d6d6
| 102327 ||  || — || October 4, 1999 || Socorro || LINEAR || — || align=right | 4.2 km || 
|-id=328 bgcolor=#fefefe
| 102328 ||  || — || October 4, 1999 || Socorro || LINEAR || — || align=right | 1.6 km || 
|-id=329 bgcolor=#fefefe
| 102329 ||  || — || October 4, 1999 || Socorro || LINEAR || V || align=right | 1.7 km || 
|-id=330 bgcolor=#fefefe
| 102330 ||  || — || October 4, 1999 || Socorro || LINEAR || FLO || align=right | 1.1 km || 
|-id=331 bgcolor=#fefefe
| 102331 ||  || — || October 4, 1999 || Socorro || LINEAR || FLO || align=right | 2.0 km || 
|-id=332 bgcolor=#fefefe
| 102332 ||  || — || October 4, 1999 || Socorro || LINEAR || NYS || align=right | 1.3 km || 
|-id=333 bgcolor=#fefefe
| 102333 ||  || — || October 4, 1999 || Socorro || LINEAR || — || align=right | 1.2 km || 
|-id=334 bgcolor=#fefefe
| 102334 ||  || — || October 4, 1999 || Socorro || LINEAR || FLO || align=right | 1.5 km || 
|-id=335 bgcolor=#d6d6d6
| 102335 ||  || — || October 4, 1999 || Socorro || LINEAR || — || align=right | 8.6 km || 
|-id=336 bgcolor=#E9E9E9
| 102336 ||  || — || October 4, 1999 || Socorro || LINEAR || — || align=right | 2.3 km || 
|-id=337 bgcolor=#E9E9E9
| 102337 ||  || — || October 4, 1999 || Socorro || LINEAR || — || align=right | 2.6 km || 
|-id=338 bgcolor=#E9E9E9
| 102338 ||  || — || October 4, 1999 || Socorro || LINEAR || — || align=right | 1.8 km || 
|-id=339 bgcolor=#fefefe
| 102339 ||  || — || October 4, 1999 || Socorro || LINEAR || V || align=right | 1.7 km || 
|-id=340 bgcolor=#fefefe
| 102340 ||  || — || October 4, 1999 || Socorro || LINEAR || NYS || align=right | 1.5 km || 
|-id=341 bgcolor=#E9E9E9
| 102341 ||  || — || October 4, 1999 || Socorro || LINEAR || — || align=right | 2.3 km || 
|-id=342 bgcolor=#fefefe
| 102342 ||  || — || October 4, 1999 || Socorro || LINEAR || V || align=right | 1.3 km || 
|-id=343 bgcolor=#fefefe
| 102343 ||  || — || October 4, 1999 || Socorro || LINEAR || NYS || align=right | 3.6 km || 
|-id=344 bgcolor=#fefefe
| 102344 ||  || — || October 4, 1999 || Socorro || LINEAR || NYS || align=right | 1.0 km || 
|-id=345 bgcolor=#fefefe
| 102345 ||  || — || October 4, 1999 || Socorro || LINEAR || — || align=right | 1.8 km || 
|-id=346 bgcolor=#fefefe
| 102346 ||  || — || October 4, 1999 || Socorro || LINEAR || — || align=right | 1.9 km || 
|-id=347 bgcolor=#fefefe
| 102347 ||  || — || October 4, 1999 || Socorro || LINEAR || — || align=right | 1.4 km || 
|-id=348 bgcolor=#d6d6d6
| 102348 ||  || — || October 4, 1999 || Socorro || LINEAR || — || align=right | 6.7 km || 
|-id=349 bgcolor=#fefefe
| 102349 ||  || — || October 4, 1999 || Socorro || LINEAR || V || align=right | 1.5 km || 
|-id=350 bgcolor=#fefefe
| 102350 ||  || — || October 4, 1999 || Socorro || LINEAR || NYS || align=right | 2.7 km || 
|-id=351 bgcolor=#fefefe
| 102351 ||  || — || October 4, 1999 || Socorro || LINEAR || — || align=right | 1.6 km || 
|-id=352 bgcolor=#fefefe
| 102352 ||  || — || October 4, 1999 || Socorro || LINEAR || — || align=right | 1.2 km || 
|-id=353 bgcolor=#fefefe
| 102353 ||  || — || October 4, 1999 || Socorro || LINEAR || EUT || align=right | 2.2 km || 
|-id=354 bgcolor=#fefefe
| 102354 ||  || — || October 6, 1999 || Socorro || LINEAR || — || align=right | 1.7 km || 
|-id=355 bgcolor=#d6d6d6
| 102355 ||  || — || October 6, 1999 || Socorro || LINEAR || — || align=right | 5.8 km || 
|-id=356 bgcolor=#E9E9E9
| 102356 ||  || — || October 6, 1999 || Socorro || LINEAR || — || align=right | 1.7 km || 
|-id=357 bgcolor=#fefefe
| 102357 ||  || — || October 6, 1999 || Socorro || LINEAR || MAS || align=right | 1.1 km || 
|-id=358 bgcolor=#E9E9E9
| 102358 ||  || — || October 6, 1999 || Socorro || LINEAR || — || align=right | 2.4 km || 
|-id=359 bgcolor=#E9E9E9
| 102359 ||  || — || October 6, 1999 || Socorro || LINEAR || — || align=right | 2.9 km || 
|-id=360 bgcolor=#E9E9E9
| 102360 ||  || — || October 6, 1999 || Socorro || LINEAR || — || align=right | 2.5 km || 
|-id=361 bgcolor=#fefefe
| 102361 ||  || — || October 6, 1999 || Socorro || LINEAR || — || align=right | 1.1 km || 
|-id=362 bgcolor=#E9E9E9
| 102362 ||  || — || October 6, 1999 || Socorro || LINEAR || — || align=right | 3.3 km || 
|-id=363 bgcolor=#fefefe
| 102363 ||  || — || October 6, 1999 || Socorro || LINEAR || NYS || align=right | 1.7 km || 
|-id=364 bgcolor=#fefefe
| 102364 ||  || — || October 6, 1999 || Socorro || LINEAR || NYS || align=right | 1.5 km || 
|-id=365 bgcolor=#fefefe
| 102365 ||  || — || October 6, 1999 || Socorro || LINEAR || — || align=right | 1.6 km || 
|-id=366 bgcolor=#E9E9E9
| 102366 ||  || — || October 6, 1999 || Socorro || LINEAR || — || align=right | 1.5 km || 
|-id=367 bgcolor=#E9E9E9
| 102367 ||  || — || October 6, 1999 || Socorro || LINEAR || — || align=right | 2.0 km || 
|-id=368 bgcolor=#E9E9E9
| 102368 ||  || — || October 6, 1999 || Socorro || LINEAR || HEN || align=right | 2.1 km || 
|-id=369 bgcolor=#fefefe
| 102369 ||  || — || October 7, 1999 || Socorro || LINEAR || — || align=right | 1.8 km || 
|-id=370 bgcolor=#E9E9E9
| 102370 ||  || — || October 7, 1999 || Socorro || LINEAR || — || align=right | 3.3 km || 
|-id=371 bgcolor=#E9E9E9
| 102371 ||  || — || October 7, 1999 || Socorro || LINEAR || — || align=right | 2.2 km || 
|-id=372 bgcolor=#fefefe
| 102372 ||  || — || October 7, 1999 || Socorro || LINEAR || V || align=right | 1.4 km || 
|-id=373 bgcolor=#fefefe
| 102373 ||  || — || October 7, 1999 || Socorro || LINEAR || V || align=right | 1.4 km || 
|-id=374 bgcolor=#fefefe
| 102374 ||  || — || October 7, 1999 || Socorro || LINEAR || V || align=right | 2.6 km || 
|-id=375 bgcolor=#d6d6d6
| 102375 ||  || — || October 7, 1999 || Socorro || LINEAR || EOS || align=right | 3.8 km || 
|-id=376 bgcolor=#fefefe
| 102376 ||  || — || October 7, 1999 || Socorro || LINEAR || — || align=right | 2.9 km || 
|-id=377 bgcolor=#fefefe
| 102377 ||  || — || October 7, 1999 || Socorro || LINEAR || NYS || align=right | 1.3 km || 
|-id=378 bgcolor=#fefefe
| 102378 ||  || — || October 7, 1999 || Socorro || LINEAR || NYS || align=right | 1.5 km || 
|-id=379 bgcolor=#d6d6d6
| 102379 ||  || — || October 7, 1999 || Socorro || LINEAR || KOR || align=right | 2.8 km || 
|-id=380 bgcolor=#fefefe
| 102380 ||  || — || October 7, 1999 || Socorro || LINEAR || V || align=right | 1.4 km || 
|-id=381 bgcolor=#fefefe
| 102381 ||  || — || October 7, 1999 || Socorro || LINEAR || V || align=right | 1.6 km || 
|-id=382 bgcolor=#fefefe
| 102382 ||  || — || October 7, 1999 || Socorro || LINEAR || V || align=right | 1.6 km || 
|-id=383 bgcolor=#E9E9E9
| 102383 ||  || — || October 7, 1999 || Socorro || LINEAR || — || align=right | 2.7 km || 
|-id=384 bgcolor=#E9E9E9
| 102384 ||  || — || October 7, 1999 || Socorro || LINEAR || — || align=right | 1.8 km || 
|-id=385 bgcolor=#E9E9E9
| 102385 ||  || — || October 7, 1999 || Socorro || LINEAR || — || align=right | 2.7 km || 
|-id=386 bgcolor=#fefefe
| 102386 ||  || — || October 7, 1999 || Socorro || LINEAR || V || align=right | 1.9 km || 
|-id=387 bgcolor=#fefefe
| 102387 ||  || — || October 7, 1999 || Socorro || LINEAR || FLO || align=right | 1.4 km || 
|-id=388 bgcolor=#fefefe
| 102388 ||  || — || October 7, 1999 || Socorro || LINEAR || — || align=right | 2.1 km || 
|-id=389 bgcolor=#fefefe
| 102389 ||  || — || October 7, 1999 || Socorro || LINEAR || — || align=right | 1.9 km || 
|-id=390 bgcolor=#fefefe
| 102390 ||  || — || October 7, 1999 || Socorro || LINEAR || — || align=right | 1.9 km || 
|-id=391 bgcolor=#E9E9E9
| 102391 ||  || — || October 9, 1999 || Socorro || LINEAR || — || align=right | 6.5 km || 
|-id=392 bgcolor=#E9E9E9
| 102392 ||  || — || October 9, 1999 || Socorro || LINEAR || — || align=right | 2.0 km || 
|-id=393 bgcolor=#fefefe
| 102393 ||  || — || October 9, 1999 || Socorro || LINEAR || — || align=right | 1.8 km || 
|-id=394 bgcolor=#fefefe
| 102394 ||  || — || October 9, 1999 || Socorro || LINEAR || — || align=right | 1.5 km || 
|-id=395 bgcolor=#fefefe
| 102395 ||  || — || October 9, 1999 || Socorro || LINEAR || V || align=right | 1.4 km || 
|-id=396 bgcolor=#fefefe
| 102396 ||  || — || October 10, 1999 || Socorro || LINEAR || V || align=right | 1.3 km || 
|-id=397 bgcolor=#fefefe
| 102397 ||  || — || October 10, 1999 || Socorro || LINEAR || V || align=right | 1.2 km || 
|-id=398 bgcolor=#fefefe
| 102398 ||  || — || October 10, 1999 || Socorro || LINEAR || V || align=right | 1.2 km || 
|-id=399 bgcolor=#fefefe
| 102399 ||  || — || October 10, 1999 || Socorro || LINEAR || — || align=right | 1.6 km || 
|-id=400 bgcolor=#fefefe
| 102400 ||  || — || October 10, 1999 || Socorro || LINEAR || NYS || align=right | 1.2 km || 
|}

102401–102500 

|-bgcolor=#E9E9E9
| 102401 ||  || — || October 10, 1999 || Socorro || LINEAR || AGN || align=right | 2.6 km || 
|-id=402 bgcolor=#fefefe
| 102402 ||  || — || October 10, 1999 || Socorro || LINEAR || V || align=right | 1.4 km || 
|-id=403 bgcolor=#fefefe
| 102403 ||  || — || October 10, 1999 || Socorro || LINEAR || EUT || align=right | 1.3 km || 
|-id=404 bgcolor=#fefefe
| 102404 ||  || — || October 10, 1999 || Socorro || LINEAR || — || align=right | 1.7 km || 
|-id=405 bgcolor=#FA8072
| 102405 ||  || — || October 10, 1999 || Socorro || LINEAR || — || align=right | 1.6 km || 
|-id=406 bgcolor=#fefefe
| 102406 ||  || — || October 10, 1999 || Socorro || LINEAR || MAS || align=right | 1.1 km || 
|-id=407 bgcolor=#E9E9E9
| 102407 ||  || — || October 10, 1999 || Socorro || LINEAR || — || align=right | 2.0 km || 
|-id=408 bgcolor=#fefefe
| 102408 ||  || — || October 10, 1999 || Socorro || LINEAR || V || align=right | 1.2 km || 
|-id=409 bgcolor=#E9E9E9
| 102409 ||  || — || October 10, 1999 || Socorro || LINEAR || — || align=right | 2.3 km || 
|-id=410 bgcolor=#E9E9E9
| 102410 ||  || — || October 10, 1999 || Socorro || LINEAR || WIT || align=right | 1.9 km || 
|-id=411 bgcolor=#fefefe
| 102411 ||  || — || October 10, 1999 || Socorro || LINEAR || — || align=right | 1.5 km || 
|-id=412 bgcolor=#fefefe
| 102412 ||  || — || October 10, 1999 || Socorro || LINEAR || MAS || align=right | 1.7 km || 
|-id=413 bgcolor=#E9E9E9
| 102413 ||  || — || October 10, 1999 || Socorro || LINEAR || — || align=right | 3.6 km || 
|-id=414 bgcolor=#E9E9E9
| 102414 ||  || — || October 11, 1999 || Socorro || LINEAR || — || align=right | 1.8 km || 
|-id=415 bgcolor=#E9E9E9
| 102415 ||  || — || October 11, 1999 || Socorro || LINEAR || — || align=right | 2.0 km || 
|-id=416 bgcolor=#fefefe
| 102416 ||  || — || October 12, 1999 || Socorro || LINEAR || — || align=right | 3.7 km || 
|-id=417 bgcolor=#fefefe
| 102417 ||  || — || October 12, 1999 || Socorro || LINEAR || LCI || align=right | 2.0 km || 
|-id=418 bgcolor=#E9E9E9
| 102418 ||  || — || October 12, 1999 || Socorro || LINEAR || — || align=right | 2.3 km || 
|-id=419 bgcolor=#d6d6d6
| 102419 ||  || — || October 12, 1999 || Socorro || LINEAR || ALA || align=right | 10 km || 
|-id=420 bgcolor=#E9E9E9
| 102420 ||  || — || October 12, 1999 || Socorro || LINEAR || EUN || align=right | 2.3 km || 
|-id=421 bgcolor=#E9E9E9
| 102421 ||  || — || October 12, 1999 || Socorro || LINEAR || — || align=right | 3.3 km || 
|-id=422 bgcolor=#fefefe
| 102422 ||  || — || October 12, 1999 || Socorro || LINEAR || FLO || align=right | 1.3 km || 
|-id=423 bgcolor=#E9E9E9
| 102423 ||  || — || October 12, 1999 || Socorro || LINEAR || — || align=right | 4.8 km || 
|-id=424 bgcolor=#fefefe
| 102424 ||  || — || October 12, 1999 || Socorro || LINEAR || FLO || align=right | 1.6 km || 
|-id=425 bgcolor=#fefefe
| 102425 ||  || — || October 12, 1999 || Socorro || LINEAR || — || align=right | 1.9 km || 
|-id=426 bgcolor=#E9E9E9
| 102426 ||  || — || October 12, 1999 || Socorro || LINEAR || — || align=right | 2.7 km || 
|-id=427 bgcolor=#E9E9E9
| 102427 ||  || — || October 12, 1999 || Socorro || LINEAR || — || align=right | 1.9 km || 
|-id=428 bgcolor=#fefefe
| 102428 ||  || — || October 13, 1999 || Socorro || LINEAR || — || align=right | 1.7 km || 
|-id=429 bgcolor=#E9E9E9
| 102429 ||  || — || October 13, 1999 || Socorro || LINEAR || — || align=right | 1.6 km || 
|-id=430 bgcolor=#fefefe
| 102430 ||  || — || October 13, 1999 || Socorro || LINEAR || V || align=right | 1.5 km || 
|-id=431 bgcolor=#FA8072
| 102431 ||  || — || October 13, 1999 || Socorro || LINEAR || — || align=right | 1.3 km || 
|-id=432 bgcolor=#d6d6d6
| 102432 ||  || — || October 14, 1999 || Socorro || LINEAR || — || align=right | 8.8 km || 
|-id=433 bgcolor=#fefefe
| 102433 ||  || — || October 14, 1999 || Socorro || LINEAR || — || align=right | 2.2 km || 
|-id=434 bgcolor=#E9E9E9
| 102434 ||  || — || October 14, 1999 || Socorro || LINEAR || — || align=right | 6.6 km || 
|-id=435 bgcolor=#E9E9E9
| 102435 ||  || — || October 14, 1999 || Socorro || LINEAR || EUN || align=right | 2.7 km || 
|-id=436 bgcolor=#E9E9E9
| 102436 ||  || — || October 15, 1999 || Socorro || LINEAR || — || align=right | 1.6 km || 
|-id=437 bgcolor=#E9E9E9
| 102437 ||  || — || October 15, 1999 || Socorro || LINEAR || — || align=right | 2.8 km || 
|-id=438 bgcolor=#fefefe
| 102438 ||  || — || October 15, 1999 || Socorro || LINEAR || — || align=right | 1.4 km || 
|-id=439 bgcolor=#fefefe
| 102439 ||  || — || October 15, 1999 || Socorro || LINEAR || — || align=right | 1.4 km || 
|-id=440 bgcolor=#fefefe
| 102440 ||  || — || October 15, 1999 || Socorro || LINEAR || MAS || align=right | 1.3 km || 
|-id=441 bgcolor=#E9E9E9
| 102441 ||  || — || October 15, 1999 || Socorro || LINEAR || — || align=right | 2.1 km || 
|-id=442 bgcolor=#d6d6d6
| 102442 ||  || — || October 15, 1999 || Socorro || LINEAR || KOR || align=right | 3.1 km || 
|-id=443 bgcolor=#fefefe
| 102443 ||  || — || October 15, 1999 || Socorro || LINEAR || NYS || align=right | 1.5 km || 
|-id=444 bgcolor=#E9E9E9
| 102444 ||  || — || October 15, 1999 || Socorro || LINEAR || — || align=right | 2.1 km || 
|-id=445 bgcolor=#E9E9E9
| 102445 ||  || — || October 15, 1999 || Socorro || LINEAR || — || align=right | 2.6 km || 
|-id=446 bgcolor=#E9E9E9
| 102446 ||  || — || October 15, 1999 || Socorro || LINEAR || — || align=right | 1.7 km || 
|-id=447 bgcolor=#fefefe
| 102447 ||  || — || October 15, 1999 || Socorro || LINEAR || — || align=right | 1.7 km || 
|-id=448 bgcolor=#fefefe
| 102448 ||  || — || October 15, 1999 || Socorro || LINEAR || NYS || align=right | 2.6 km || 
|-id=449 bgcolor=#fefefe
| 102449 ||  || — || October 15, 1999 || Socorro || LINEAR || ERI || align=right | 2.7 km || 
|-id=450 bgcolor=#fefefe
| 102450 ||  || — || October 15, 1999 || Socorro || LINEAR || MAS || align=right | 1.7 km || 
|-id=451 bgcolor=#E9E9E9
| 102451 ||  || — || October 15, 1999 || Socorro || LINEAR || — || align=right | 1.9 km || 
|-id=452 bgcolor=#fefefe
| 102452 ||  || — || October 15, 1999 || Socorro || LINEAR || — || align=right | 1.4 km || 
|-id=453 bgcolor=#fefefe
| 102453 ||  || — || October 15, 1999 || Socorro || LINEAR || V || align=right | 1.2 km || 
|-id=454 bgcolor=#FA8072
| 102454 ||  || — || October 1, 1999 || Catalina || CSS || — || align=right | 1.4 km || 
|-id=455 bgcolor=#fefefe
| 102455 ||  || — || October 1, 1999 || Catalina || CSS || — || align=right | 2.1 km || 
|-id=456 bgcolor=#fefefe
| 102456 ||  || — || October 2, 1999 || Socorro || LINEAR || V || align=right | 1.2 km || 
|-id=457 bgcolor=#fefefe
| 102457 ||  || — || October 2, 1999 || Anderson Mesa || LONEOS || — || align=right | 1.9 km || 
|-id=458 bgcolor=#d6d6d6
| 102458 ||  || — || October 2, 1999 || Kitt Peak || Spacewatch || EOS || align=right | 3.7 km || 
|-id=459 bgcolor=#fefefe
| 102459 ||  || — || October 2, 1999 || Kitt Peak || Spacewatch || — || align=right | 1.4 km || 
|-id=460 bgcolor=#fefefe
| 102460 ||  || — || October 3, 1999 || Kitt Peak || Spacewatch || NYS || align=right | 2.0 km || 
|-id=461 bgcolor=#fefefe
| 102461 ||  || — || October 1, 1999 || Anderson Mesa || LONEOS || — || align=right | 1.3 km || 
|-id=462 bgcolor=#fefefe
| 102462 ||  || — || October 4, 1999 || Anderson Mesa || LONEOS || — || align=right | 1.8 km || 
|-id=463 bgcolor=#fefefe
| 102463 ||  || — || October 3, 1999 || Anderson Mesa || LONEOS || V || align=right | 1.3 km || 
|-id=464 bgcolor=#fefefe
| 102464 ||  || — || October 3, 1999 || Anderson Mesa || LONEOS || V || align=right | 1.3 km || 
|-id=465 bgcolor=#d6d6d6
| 102465 ||  || — || October 5, 1999 || Catalina || CSS || URS || align=right | 7.2 km || 
|-id=466 bgcolor=#E9E9E9
| 102466 ||  || — || October 6, 1999 || Socorro || LINEAR || — || align=right | 1.6 km || 
|-id=467 bgcolor=#E9E9E9
| 102467 ||  || — || October 7, 1999 || Catalina || CSS || — || align=right | 3.0 km || 
|-id=468 bgcolor=#fefefe
| 102468 ||  || — || October 3, 1999 || Catalina || CSS || FLO || align=right | 1.4 km || 
|-id=469 bgcolor=#fefefe
| 102469 ||  || — || October 3, 1999 || Catalina || CSS || FLO || align=right | 1.6 km || 
|-id=470 bgcolor=#fefefe
| 102470 ||  || — || October 4, 1999 || Catalina || CSS || — || align=right | 1.4 km || 
|-id=471 bgcolor=#fefefe
| 102471 ||  || — || October 4, 1999 || Catalina || CSS || V || align=right | 1.5 km || 
|-id=472 bgcolor=#fefefe
| 102472 ||  || — || October 4, 1999 || Catalina || CSS || — || align=right | 2.9 km || 
|-id=473 bgcolor=#E9E9E9
| 102473 ||  || — || October 7, 1999 || Catalina || CSS || — || align=right | 4.2 km || 
|-id=474 bgcolor=#E9E9E9
| 102474 ||  || — || October 7, 1999 || Catalina || CSS || EUN || align=right | 2.3 km || 
|-id=475 bgcolor=#E9E9E9
| 102475 ||  || — || October 7, 1999 || Catalina || CSS || — || align=right | 3.3 km || 
|-id=476 bgcolor=#fefefe
| 102476 ||  || — || October 8, 1999 || Catalina || CSS || — || align=right | 3.0 km || 
|-id=477 bgcolor=#E9E9E9
| 102477 ||  || — || October 8, 1999 || Catalina || CSS || — || align=right | 2.4 km || 
|-id=478 bgcolor=#E9E9E9
| 102478 ||  || — || October 8, 1999 || Catalina || CSS || — || align=right | 2.2 km || 
|-id=479 bgcolor=#E9E9E9
| 102479 ||  || — || October 9, 1999 || Catalina || CSS || — || align=right | 2.1 km || 
|-id=480 bgcolor=#d6d6d6
| 102480 ||  || — || October 9, 1999 || Catalina || CSS || — || align=right | 4.8 km || 
|-id=481 bgcolor=#E9E9E9
| 102481 ||  || — || October 8, 1999 || Socorro || LINEAR || — || align=right | 3.7 km || 
|-id=482 bgcolor=#E9E9E9
| 102482 ||  || — || October 8, 1999 || Socorro || LINEAR || — || align=right | 2.4 km || 
|-id=483 bgcolor=#fefefe
| 102483 ||  || — || October 9, 1999 || Socorro || LINEAR || — || align=right | 4.9 km || 
|-id=484 bgcolor=#fefefe
| 102484 ||  || — || October 9, 1999 || Socorro || LINEAR || — || align=right | 1.3 km || 
|-id=485 bgcolor=#E9E9E9
| 102485 ||  || — || October 9, 1999 || Socorro || LINEAR || — || align=right | 2.4 km || 
|-id=486 bgcolor=#E9E9E9
| 102486 ||  || — || October 9, 1999 || Socorro || LINEAR || — || align=right | 1.4 km || 
|-id=487 bgcolor=#fefefe
| 102487 ||  || — || October 10, 1999 || Kitt Peak || Spacewatch || — || align=right | 1.3 km || 
|-id=488 bgcolor=#fefefe
| 102488 ||  || — || October 12, 1999 || Socorro || LINEAR || — || align=right | 1.8 km || 
|-id=489 bgcolor=#fefefe
| 102489 ||  || — || October 13, 1999 || Socorro || LINEAR || — || align=right | 1.4 km || 
|-id=490 bgcolor=#d6d6d6
| 102490 ||  || — || October 15, 1999 || Kitt Peak || Spacewatch || — || align=right | 5.2 km || 
|-id=491 bgcolor=#fefefe
| 102491 ||  || — || October 15, 1999 || Kitt Peak || Spacewatch || — || align=right | 3.5 km || 
|-id=492 bgcolor=#d6d6d6
| 102492 ||  || — || October 3, 1999 || Socorro || LINEAR || — || align=right | 14 km || 
|-id=493 bgcolor=#fefefe
| 102493 ||  || — || October 3, 1999 || Socorro || LINEAR || LCI || align=right | 2.9 km || 
|-id=494 bgcolor=#E9E9E9
| 102494 ||  || — || October 5, 1999 || Socorro || LINEAR || — || align=right | 4.6 km || 
|-id=495 bgcolor=#fefefe
| 102495 ||  || — || October 6, 1999 || Socorro || LINEAR || — || align=right | 1.4 km || 
|-id=496 bgcolor=#fefefe
| 102496 ||  || — || October 6, 1999 || Socorro || LINEAR || KLI || align=right | 3.6 km || 
|-id=497 bgcolor=#fefefe
| 102497 ||  || — || October 6, 1999 || Socorro || LINEAR || — || align=right | 2.2 km || 
|-id=498 bgcolor=#fefefe
| 102498 ||  || — || October 8, 1999 || Socorro || LINEAR || — || align=right | 1.4 km || 
|-id=499 bgcolor=#E9E9E9
| 102499 ||  || — || October 8, 1999 || Socorro || LINEAR || BRU || align=right | 5.2 km || 
|-id=500 bgcolor=#E9E9E9
| 102500 ||  || — || October 9, 1999 || Socorro || LINEAR || — || align=right | 3.9 km || 
|}

102501–102600 

|-bgcolor=#fefefe
| 102501 ||  || — || October 9, 1999 || Socorro || LINEAR || V || align=right | 1.4 km || 
|-id=502 bgcolor=#fefefe
| 102502 ||  || — || October 9, 1999 || Socorro || LINEAR || — || align=right | 1.6 km || 
|-id=503 bgcolor=#fefefe
| 102503 ||  || — || October 10, 1999 || Socorro || LINEAR || NYS || align=right | 3.2 km || 
|-id=504 bgcolor=#fefefe
| 102504 ||  || — || October 10, 1999 || Socorro || LINEAR || — || align=right | 1.8 km || 
|-id=505 bgcolor=#fefefe
| 102505 ||  || — || October 10, 1999 || Socorro || LINEAR || FLO || align=right | 1.1 km || 
|-id=506 bgcolor=#fefefe
| 102506 ||  || — || October 10, 1999 || Socorro || LINEAR || NYS || align=right | 1.3 km || 
|-id=507 bgcolor=#E9E9E9
| 102507 ||  || — || October 10, 1999 || Socorro || LINEAR || — || align=right | 2.8 km || 
|-id=508 bgcolor=#fefefe
| 102508 ||  || — || October 11, 1999 || Socorro || LINEAR || NYS || align=right | 1.2 km || 
|-id=509 bgcolor=#E9E9E9
| 102509 ||  || — || October 12, 1999 || Socorro || LINEAR || — || align=right | 3.0 km || 
|-id=510 bgcolor=#fefefe
| 102510 ||  || — || October 12, 1999 || Socorro || LINEAR || — || align=right | 2.0 km || 
|-id=511 bgcolor=#fefefe
| 102511 ||  || — || October 2, 1999 || Kitt Peak || Spacewatch || NYS || align=right | 1.1 km || 
|-id=512 bgcolor=#d6d6d6
| 102512 ||  || — || October 3, 1999 || Kitt Peak || Spacewatch || — || align=right | 7.3 km || 
|-id=513 bgcolor=#fefefe
| 102513 ||  || — || October 4, 1999 || Kitt Peak || Spacewatch || — || align=right | 1.3 km || 
|-id=514 bgcolor=#fefefe
| 102514 ||  || — || October 4, 1999 || Catalina || CSS || V || align=right | 1.4 km || 
|-id=515 bgcolor=#fefefe
| 102515 ||  || — || October 3, 1999 || Catalina || CSS || — || align=right | 1.6 km || 
|-id=516 bgcolor=#fefefe
| 102516 ||  || — || October 6, 1999 || Socorro || LINEAR || — || align=right | 1.2 km || 
|-id=517 bgcolor=#fefefe
| 102517 ||  || — || October 4, 1999 || Kitt Peak || Spacewatch || V || align=right | 1.3 km || 
|-id=518 bgcolor=#E9E9E9
| 102518 ||  || — || October 8, 1999 || Kitt Peak || Spacewatch || — || align=right | 1.2 km || 
|-id=519 bgcolor=#fefefe
| 102519 ||  || — || October 5, 1999 || Anderson Mesa || LONEOS || FLO || align=right | 1.3 km || 
|-id=520 bgcolor=#fefefe
| 102520 ||  || — || October 12, 1999 || Kitt Peak || Spacewatch || — || align=right | 1.5 km || 
|-id=521 bgcolor=#fefefe
| 102521 ||  || — || October 9, 1999 || Socorro || LINEAR || NYS || align=right | 1.1 km || 
|-id=522 bgcolor=#d6d6d6
| 102522 ||  || — || October 10, 1999 || Socorro || LINEAR || — || align=right | 3.6 km || 
|-id=523 bgcolor=#fefefe
| 102523 || 1999 UG || — || October 16, 1999 || Višnjan Observatory || K. Korlević || MAS || align=right | 1.8 km || 
|-id=524 bgcolor=#E9E9E9
| 102524 || 1999 UK || — || October 16, 1999 || Višnjan Observatory || K. Korlević || — || align=right | 2.3 km || 
|-id=525 bgcolor=#fefefe
| 102525 || 1999 UV || — || October 16, 1999 || Višnjan Observatory || K. Korlević || V || align=right | 2.8 km || 
|-id=526 bgcolor=#fefefe
| 102526 ||  || — || October 16, 1999 || Višnjan Observatory || K. Korlević || FLO || align=right | 1.6 km || 
|-id=527 bgcolor=#fefefe
| 102527 ||  || — || October 17, 1999 || Višnjan Observatory || K. Korlević || V || align=right | 1.4 km || 
|-id=528 bgcolor=#FA8072
| 102528 ||  || — || October 26, 1999 || Anderson Mesa || LONEOS || unusual || align=right | 13 km || 
|-id=529 bgcolor=#fefefe
| 102529 ||  || — || October 27, 1999 || Višnjan Observatory || K. Korlević || V || align=right | 2.0 km || 
|-id=530 bgcolor=#E9E9E9
| 102530 ||  || — || October 30, 1999 || Biosphere 2 || G. J. Garradd || — || align=right | 2.4 km || 
|-id=531 bgcolor=#fefefe
| 102531 ||  || — || October 31, 1999 || Ondřejov || L. Kotková || NYS || align=right | 1.5 km || 
|-id=532 bgcolor=#E9E9E9
| 102532 ||  || — || October 31, 1999 || Modra || A. Galád, J. Tóth || — || align=right | 2.8 km || 
|-id=533 bgcolor=#E9E9E9
| 102533 ||  || — || October 28, 1999 || Catalina || CSS || — || align=right | 2.1 km || 
|-id=534 bgcolor=#E9E9E9
| 102534 ||  || — || October 29, 1999 || Socorro || LINEAR || — || align=right | 9.1 km || 
|-id=535 bgcolor=#E9E9E9
| 102535 ||  || — || October 28, 1999 || Xinglong || SCAP || — || align=right | 2.5 km || 
|-id=536 bgcolor=#E9E9E9
| 102536 Luanenjie ||  ||  || October 28, 1999 || Xinglong || SCAP || — || align=right | 5.7 km || 
|-id=537 bgcolor=#fefefe
| 102537 ||  || — || October 29, 1999 || Catalina || CSS || V || align=right | 1.4 km || 
|-id=538 bgcolor=#fefefe
| 102538 ||  || — || October 31, 1999 || Socorro || LINEAR || PHO || align=right | 2.3 km || 
|-id=539 bgcolor=#fefefe
| 102539 ||  || — || October 31, 1999 || Socorro || LINEAR || — || align=right | 3.6 km || 
|-id=540 bgcolor=#fefefe
| 102540 ||  || — || October 29, 1999 || Kitt Peak || Spacewatch || — || align=right | 1.6 km || 
|-id=541 bgcolor=#E9E9E9
| 102541 ||  || — || October 28, 1999 || Catalina || CSS || — || align=right | 3.7 km || 
|-id=542 bgcolor=#E9E9E9
| 102542 ||  || — || October 29, 1999 || Catalina || CSS || — || align=right | 3.6 km || 
|-id=543 bgcolor=#fefefe
| 102543 ||  || — || October 29, 1999 || Catalina || CSS || V || align=right | 1.7 km || 
|-id=544 bgcolor=#fefefe
| 102544 ||  || — || October 29, 1999 || Catalina || CSS || V || align=right | 1.5 km || 
|-id=545 bgcolor=#E9E9E9
| 102545 ||  || — || October 29, 1999 || Catalina || CSS || — || align=right | 3.2 km || 
|-id=546 bgcolor=#fefefe
| 102546 ||  || — || October 29, 1999 || Catalina || CSS || V || align=right | 1.7 km || 
|-id=547 bgcolor=#fefefe
| 102547 ||  || — || October 29, 1999 || Catalina || CSS || — || align=right | 1.5 km || 
|-id=548 bgcolor=#fefefe
| 102548 ||  || — || October 29, 1999 || Catalina || CSS || V || align=right | 1.8 km || 
|-id=549 bgcolor=#fefefe
| 102549 ||  || — || October 29, 1999 || Catalina || CSS || V || align=right | 1.2 km || 
|-id=550 bgcolor=#fefefe
| 102550 ||  || — || October 30, 1999 || Kitt Peak || Spacewatch || MAS || align=right | 1.4 km || 
|-id=551 bgcolor=#E9E9E9
| 102551 ||  || — || October 30, 1999 || Kitt Peak || Spacewatch || — || align=right | 1.7 km || 
|-id=552 bgcolor=#fefefe
| 102552 ||  || — || October 31, 1999 || Kitt Peak || Spacewatch || — || align=right | 1.2 km || 
|-id=553 bgcolor=#fefefe
| 102553 ||  || — || October 31, 1999 || Kitt Peak || Spacewatch || NYS || align=right | 1.1 km || 
|-id=554 bgcolor=#fefefe
| 102554 ||  || — || October 31, 1999 || Kitt Peak || Spacewatch || — || align=right | 1.3 km || 
|-id=555 bgcolor=#E9E9E9
| 102555 ||  || — || October 31, 1999 || Kitt Peak || Spacewatch || — || align=right | 1.8 km || 
|-id=556 bgcolor=#fefefe
| 102556 ||  || — || October 28, 1999 || Catalina || CSS || V || align=right | 1.8 km || 
|-id=557 bgcolor=#fefefe
| 102557 ||  || — || October 28, 1999 || Catalina || CSS || — || align=right | 1.9 km || 
|-id=558 bgcolor=#E9E9E9
| 102558 ||  || — || October 28, 1999 || Catalina || CSS || DOR || align=right | 6.4 km || 
|-id=559 bgcolor=#d6d6d6
| 102559 ||  || — || October 28, 1999 || Catalina || CSS || 7:4 || align=right | 9.6 km || 
|-id=560 bgcolor=#fefefe
| 102560 ||  || — || October 29, 1999 || Catalina || CSS || NYS || align=right | 1.7 km || 
|-id=561 bgcolor=#E9E9E9
| 102561 ||  || — || October 30, 1999 || Kitt Peak || Spacewatch || GEF || align=right | 4.7 km || 
|-id=562 bgcolor=#fefefe
| 102562 ||  || — || October 30, 1999 || Kitt Peak || Spacewatch || FLO || align=right | 1.2 km || 
|-id=563 bgcolor=#fefefe
| 102563 ||  || — || October 31, 1999 || Kitt Peak || Spacewatch || — || align=right | 1.5 km || 
|-id=564 bgcolor=#fefefe
| 102564 ||  || — || October 31, 1999 || Kitt Peak || Spacewatch || NYS || align=right | 1.3 km || 
|-id=565 bgcolor=#E9E9E9
| 102565 ||  || — || October 31, 1999 || Kitt Peak || Spacewatch || — || align=right | 1.8 km || 
|-id=566 bgcolor=#fefefe
| 102566 ||  || — || October 31, 1999 || Kitt Peak || Spacewatch || MAS || align=right | 1.3 km || 
|-id=567 bgcolor=#fefefe
| 102567 ||  || — || October 31, 1999 || Kitt Peak || Spacewatch || FLO || align=right | 2.0 km || 
|-id=568 bgcolor=#fefefe
| 102568 ||  || — || October 31, 1999 || Kitt Peak || Spacewatch || MAS || align=right | 1.5 km || 
|-id=569 bgcolor=#fefefe
| 102569 ||  || — || October 30, 1999 || Kitt Peak || Spacewatch || — || align=right | 1.4 km || 
|-id=570 bgcolor=#fefefe
| 102570 ||  || — || October 31, 1999 || Kitt Peak || Spacewatch || V || align=right | 1.1 km || 
|-id=571 bgcolor=#fefefe
| 102571 ||  || — || October 31, 1999 || Kitt Peak || Spacewatch || — || align=right | 1.5 km || 
|-id=572 bgcolor=#fefefe
| 102572 ||  || — || October 16, 1999 || Kitt Peak || Spacewatch || — || align=right | 1.4 km || 
|-id=573 bgcolor=#fefefe
| 102573 ||  || — || October 16, 1999 || Socorro || LINEAR || V || align=right | 1.3 km || 
|-id=574 bgcolor=#fefefe
| 102574 ||  || — || October 17, 1999 || Anderson Mesa || LONEOS || CHL || align=right | 3.8 km || 
|-id=575 bgcolor=#fefefe
| 102575 ||  || — || October 28, 1999 || Catalina || CSS || — || align=right | 4.0 km || 
|-id=576 bgcolor=#fefefe
| 102576 ||  || — || October 28, 1999 || Catalina || CSS || — || align=right | 2.5 km || 
|-id=577 bgcolor=#fefefe
| 102577 ||  || — || October 28, 1999 || Catalina || CSS || V || align=right | 1.4 km || 
|-id=578 bgcolor=#E9E9E9
| 102578 ||  || — || October 28, 1999 || Catalina || CSS || — || align=right | 3.7 km || 
|-id=579 bgcolor=#E9E9E9
| 102579 ||  || — || October 29, 1999 || Catalina || CSS || EUN || align=right | 3.0 km || 
|-id=580 bgcolor=#fefefe
| 102580 ||  || — || October 29, 1999 || Catalina || CSS || FLO || align=right | 1.1 km || 
|-id=581 bgcolor=#fefefe
| 102581 ||  || — || October 30, 1999 || Catalina || CSS || V || align=right | 1.7 km || 
|-id=582 bgcolor=#fefefe
| 102582 ||  || — || October 31, 1999 || Catalina || CSS || — || align=right | 4.1 km || 
|-id=583 bgcolor=#E9E9E9
| 102583 ||  || — || October 29, 1999 || Catalina || CSS || — || align=right | 3.0 km || 
|-id=584 bgcolor=#E9E9E9
| 102584 ||  || — || October 30, 1999 || Catalina || CSS || RAF || align=right | 3.2 km || 
|-id=585 bgcolor=#fefefe
| 102585 ||  || — || October 30, 1999 || Catalina || CSS || NYS || align=right | 1.4 km || 
|-id=586 bgcolor=#fefefe
| 102586 ||  || — || October 30, 1999 || Catalina || CSS || — || align=right data-sort-value="0.94" | 940 m || 
|-id=587 bgcolor=#fefefe
| 102587 ||  || — || October 30, 1999 || Catalina || CSS || — || align=right | 2.7 km || 
|-id=588 bgcolor=#E9E9E9
| 102588 ||  || — || October 31, 1999 || Catalina || CSS || slow || align=right | 4.1 km || 
|-id=589 bgcolor=#fefefe
| 102589 ||  || — || October 31, 1999 || Catalina || CSS || — || align=right | 1.8 km || 
|-id=590 bgcolor=#E9E9E9
| 102590 ||  || — || October 31, 1999 || Catalina || CSS || — || align=right | 3.7 km || 
|-id=591 bgcolor=#fefefe
| 102591 ||  || — || October 29, 1999 || Kitt Peak || Spacewatch || — || align=right data-sort-value="0.85" | 850 m || 
|-id=592 bgcolor=#fefefe
| 102592 ||  || — || November 4, 1999 || Olathe || Olathe || — || align=right | 2.2 km || 
|-id=593 bgcolor=#E9E9E9
| 102593 ||  || — || November 5, 1999 || Oaxaca || J. M. Roe || — || align=right | 1.9 km || 
|-id=594 bgcolor=#fefefe
| 102594 ||  || — || November 1, 1999 || Kitt Peak || Spacewatch || V || align=right | 1.3 km || 
|-id=595 bgcolor=#fefefe
| 102595 ||  || — || November 1, 1999 || Kitt Peak || Spacewatch || MAS || align=right | 1.4 km || 
|-id=596 bgcolor=#fefefe
| 102596 ||  || — || November 1, 1999 || Kitt Peak || Spacewatch || MAS || align=right | 1.2 km || 
|-id=597 bgcolor=#E9E9E9
| 102597 ||  || — || November 1, 1999 || Kitt Peak || Spacewatch || — || align=right | 2.4 km || 
|-id=598 bgcolor=#E9E9E9
| 102598 ||  || — || November 1, 1999 || Catalina || CSS || — || align=right | 1.8 km || 
|-id=599 bgcolor=#E9E9E9
| 102599 ||  || — || November 5, 1999 || Višnjan Observatory || K. Korlević || — || align=right | 2.1 km || 
|-id=600 bgcolor=#E9E9E9
| 102600 ||  || — || November 5, 1999 || Višnjan Observatory || K. Korlević || — || align=right | 2.3 km || 
|}

102601–102700 

|-bgcolor=#fefefe
| 102601 ||  || — || November 5, 1999 || Višnjan Observatory || K. Korlević || NYS || align=right | 1.8 km || 
|-id=602 bgcolor=#fefefe
| 102602 ||  || — || November 7, 1999 || Višnjan Observatory || K. Korlević || — || align=right | 1.7 km || 
|-id=603 bgcolor=#E9E9E9
| 102603 ||  || — || November 6, 1999 || Fountain Hills || C. W. Juels || — || align=right | 2.5 km || 
|-id=604 bgcolor=#fefefe
| 102604 ||  || — || November 5, 1999 || Oizumi || T. Kobayashi || MAS || align=right | 1.8 km || 
|-id=605 bgcolor=#fefefe
| 102605 ||  || — || November 8, 1999 || Višnjan Observatory || K. Korlević || — || align=right | 2.3 km || 
|-id=606 bgcolor=#E9E9E9
| 102606 ||  || — || November 9, 1999 || Fountain Hills || C. W. Juels || MIT || align=right | 5.4 km || 
|-id=607 bgcolor=#E9E9E9
| 102607 ||  || — || November 10, 1999 || Višnjan Observatory || K. Korlević || — || align=right | 3.3 km || 
|-id=608 bgcolor=#E9E9E9
| 102608 ||  || — || November 1, 1999 || Socorro || LINEAR || BAR || align=right | 2.7 km || 
|-id=609 bgcolor=#fefefe
| 102609 ||  || — || November 2, 1999 || Socorro || LINEAR || PHO || align=right | 2.6 km || 
|-id=610 bgcolor=#fefefe
| 102610 ||  || — || November 2, 1999 || Kitt Peak || Spacewatch || NYS || align=right | 3.2 km || 
|-id=611 bgcolor=#E9E9E9
| 102611 ||  || — || November 10, 1999 || Višnjan Observatory || K. Korlević || ADE || align=right | 5.3 km || 
|-id=612 bgcolor=#fefefe
| 102612 ||  || — || November 9, 1999 || Višnjan Observatory || K. Korlević || NYS || align=right | 1.7 km || 
|-id=613 bgcolor=#fefefe
| 102613 ||  || — || November 11, 1999 || Fountain Hills || C. W. Juels || — || align=right | 4.1 km || 
|-id=614 bgcolor=#fefefe
| 102614 ||  || — || November 12, 1999 || Višnjan Observatory || K. Korlević || — || align=right | 1.4 km || 
|-id=615 bgcolor=#fefefe
| 102615 ||  || — || November 12, 1999 || Višnjan Observatory || K. Korlević || NYS || align=right | 1.4 km || 
|-id=616 bgcolor=#fefefe
| 102616 ||  || — || November 13, 1999 || Višnjan Observatory || K. Korlević || NYS || align=right | 1.9 km || 
|-id=617 bgcolor=#E9E9E9
| 102617 Allium ||  ||  || November 12, 1999 || Gnosca || S. Sposetti || — || align=right | 4.8 km || 
|-id=618 bgcolor=#fefefe
| 102618 ||  || — || November 8, 1999 || Majorca || R. Pacheco, Á. López J. || — || align=right | 2.0 km || 
|-id=619 bgcolor=#fefefe
| 102619 Crespino ||  ||  || November 12, 1999 || Gnosca || S. Sposetti || — || align=right | 3.4 km || 
|-id=620 bgcolor=#E9E9E9
| 102620 ||  || — || November 9, 1999 || Nachi-Katsuura || Y. Shimizu, T. Urata || RAF || align=right | 2.4 km || 
|-id=621 bgcolor=#E9E9E9
| 102621 ||  || — || November 13, 1999 || Saji || Saji Obs. || HEN || align=right | 1.9 km || 
|-id=622 bgcolor=#fefefe
| 102622 ||  || — || November 15, 1999 || Kleť || Kleť Obs. || — || align=right | 2.2 km || 
|-id=623 bgcolor=#E9E9E9
| 102623 ||  || — || November 3, 1999 || Socorro || LINEAR || — || align=right | 1.8 km || 
|-id=624 bgcolor=#E9E9E9
| 102624 ||  || — || November 3, 1999 || Socorro || LINEAR || EUN || align=right | 2.4 km || 
|-id=625 bgcolor=#E9E9E9
| 102625 ||  || — || November 15, 1999 || Farpoint || G. Bell, G. Hug || — || align=right | 5.0 km || 
|-id=626 bgcolor=#fefefe
| 102626 ||  || — || November 15, 1999 || Modra || L. Kornoš, J. Tóth || SVE || align=right | 5.3 km || 
|-id=627 bgcolor=#d6d6d6
| 102627 ||  || — || November 11, 1999 || Catalina || CSS || — || align=right | 7.9 km || 
|-id=628 bgcolor=#fefefe
| 102628 ||  || — || November 3, 1999 || Socorro || LINEAR || V || align=right | 1.5 km || 
|-id=629 bgcolor=#fefefe
| 102629 ||  || — || November 3, 1999 || Socorro || LINEAR || NYS || align=right | 2.2 km || 
|-id=630 bgcolor=#fefefe
| 102630 ||  || — || November 3, 1999 || Socorro || LINEAR || — || align=right | 1.8 km || 
|-id=631 bgcolor=#E9E9E9
| 102631 ||  || — || November 3, 1999 || Socorro || LINEAR || GEF || align=right | 2.7 km || 
|-id=632 bgcolor=#fefefe
| 102632 ||  || — || November 3, 1999 || Socorro || LINEAR || — || align=right | 1.4 km || 
|-id=633 bgcolor=#fefefe
| 102633 ||  || — || November 3, 1999 || Socorro || LINEAR || NYS || align=right | 1.7 km || 
|-id=634 bgcolor=#E9E9E9
| 102634 ||  || — || November 3, 1999 || Socorro || LINEAR || DOR || align=right | 6.3 km || 
|-id=635 bgcolor=#fefefe
| 102635 ||  || — || November 3, 1999 || Socorro || LINEAR || NYS || align=right | 1.7 km || 
|-id=636 bgcolor=#E9E9E9
| 102636 ||  || — || November 3, 1999 || Socorro || LINEAR || MIT || align=right | 5.2 km || 
|-id=637 bgcolor=#E9E9E9
| 102637 ||  || — || November 10, 1999 || Socorro || LINEAR || — || align=right | 2.9 km || 
|-id=638 bgcolor=#fefefe
| 102638 ||  || — || November 10, 1999 || Socorro || LINEAR || — || align=right | 1.3 km || 
|-id=639 bgcolor=#fefefe
| 102639 ||  || — || November 10, 1999 || Socorro || LINEAR || V || align=right | 1.9 km || 
|-id=640 bgcolor=#E9E9E9
| 102640 ||  || — || November 10, 1999 || Socorro || LINEAR || — || align=right | 2.3 km || 
|-id=641 bgcolor=#E9E9E9
| 102641 ||  || — || November 11, 1999 || Kitt Peak || Spacewatch || — || align=right | 1.7 km || 
|-id=642 bgcolor=#d6d6d6
| 102642 ||  || — || November 4, 1999 || Kitt Peak || Spacewatch || HYG || align=right | 6.3 km || 
|-id=643 bgcolor=#E9E9E9
| 102643 ||  || — || November 1, 1999 || Catalina || CSS || — || align=right | 2.7 km || 
|-id=644 bgcolor=#fefefe
| 102644 ||  || — || November 3, 1999 || Catalina || CSS || — || align=right | 1.9 km || 
|-id=645 bgcolor=#fefefe
| 102645 ||  || — || November 3, 1999 || Catalina || CSS || FLO || align=right | 1.2 km || 
|-id=646 bgcolor=#E9E9E9
| 102646 ||  || — || November 3, 1999 || Socorro || LINEAR || HNS || align=right | 1.9 km || 
|-id=647 bgcolor=#E9E9E9
| 102647 ||  || — || November 3, 1999 || Socorro || LINEAR || — || align=right | 6.9 km || 
|-id=648 bgcolor=#fefefe
| 102648 ||  || — || November 3, 1999 || Socorro || LINEAR || — || align=right | 2.0 km || 
|-id=649 bgcolor=#d6d6d6
| 102649 ||  || — || November 3, 1999 || Socorro || LINEAR || EOS || align=right | 3.8 km || 
|-id=650 bgcolor=#E9E9E9
| 102650 ||  || — || November 3, 1999 || Socorro || LINEAR || — || align=right | 3.5 km || 
|-id=651 bgcolor=#E9E9E9
| 102651 ||  || — || November 3, 1999 || Socorro || LINEAR || — || align=right | 2.2 km || 
|-id=652 bgcolor=#E9E9E9
| 102652 ||  || — || November 3, 1999 || Socorro || LINEAR || — || align=right | 2.3 km || 
|-id=653 bgcolor=#E9E9E9
| 102653 ||  || — || November 3, 1999 || Socorro || LINEAR || — || align=right | 4.9 km || 
|-id=654 bgcolor=#E9E9E9
| 102654 ||  || — || November 4, 1999 || Socorro || LINEAR || — || align=right | 3.2 km || 
|-id=655 bgcolor=#fefefe
| 102655 ||  || — || November 4, 1999 || Socorro || LINEAR || NYS || align=right | 1.2 km || 
|-id=656 bgcolor=#fefefe
| 102656 ||  || — || November 4, 1999 || Socorro || LINEAR || MAS || align=right | 1.6 km || 
|-id=657 bgcolor=#d6d6d6
| 102657 ||  || — || November 4, 1999 || Socorro || LINEAR || EOS || align=right | 3.9 km || 
|-id=658 bgcolor=#fefefe
| 102658 ||  || — || November 4, 1999 || Socorro || LINEAR || MAS || align=right | 1.4 km || 
|-id=659 bgcolor=#fefefe
| 102659 ||  || — || November 4, 1999 || Socorro || LINEAR || — || align=right | 1.5 km || 
|-id=660 bgcolor=#fefefe
| 102660 ||  || — || November 4, 1999 || Socorro || LINEAR || — || align=right | 1.3 km || 
|-id=661 bgcolor=#fefefe
| 102661 ||  || — || November 4, 1999 || Socorro || LINEAR || FLO || align=right | 1.2 km || 
|-id=662 bgcolor=#fefefe
| 102662 ||  || — || November 4, 1999 || Socorro || LINEAR || — || align=right | 2.0 km || 
|-id=663 bgcolor=#E9E9E9
| 102663 ||  || — || November 4, 1999 || Socorro || LINEAR || — || align=right | 3.8 km || 
|-id=664 bgcolor=#fefefe
| 102664 ||  || — || November 4, 1999 || Socorro || LINEAR || — || align=right | 1.5 km || 
|-id=665 bgcolor=#fefefe
| 102665 ||  || — || November 4, 1999 || Socorro || LINEAR || NYS || align=right | 1.9 km || 
|-id=666 bgcolor=#fefefe
| 102666 ||  || — || November 4, 1999 || Socorro || LINEAR || V || align=right | 1.6 km || 
|-id=667 bgcolor=#fefefe
| 102667 ||  || — || November 4, 1999 || Socorro || LINEAR || — || align=right | 2.2 km || 
|-id=668 bgcolor=#fefefe
| 102668 ||  || — || November 4, 1999 || Socorro || LINEAR || — || align=right | 2.0 km || 
|-id=669 bgcolor=#d6d6d6
| 102669 ||  || — || November 4, 1999 || Socorro || LINEAR || — || align=right | 4.2 km || 
|-id=670 bgcolor=#E9E9E9
| 102670 ||  || — || November 4, 1999 || Socorro || LINEAR || — || align=right | 2.5 km || 
|-id=671 bgcolor=#E9E9E9
| 102671 ||  || — || November 4, 1999 || Socorro || LINEAR || — || align=right | 2.2 km || 
|-id=672 bgcolor=#E9E9E9
| 102672 ||  || — || November 4, 1999 || Socorro || LINEAR || EUN || align=right | 3.1 km || 
|-id=673 bgcolor=#fefefe
| 102673 ||  || — || November 4, 1999 || Socorro || LINEAR || — || align=right | 1.6 km || 
|-id=674 bgcolor=#E9E9E9
| 102674 ||  || — || November 4, 1999 || Socorro || LINEAR || — || align=right | 4.3 km || 
|-id=675 bgcolor=#fefefe
| 102675 ||  || — || November 4, 1999 || Socorro || LINEAR || — || align=right | 1.7 km || 
|-id=676 bgcolor=#E9E9E9
| 102676 ||  || — || November 4, 1999 || Socorro || LINEAR || — || align=right | 2.3 km || 
|-id=677 bgcolor=#fefefe
| 102677 ||  || — || November 4, 1999 || Socorro || LINEAR || NYS || align=right | 1.4 km || 
|-id=678 bgcolor=#fefefe
| 102678 ||  || — || November 4, 1999 || Socorro || LINEAR || NYS || align=right | 1.6 km || 
|-id=679 bgcolor=#fefefe
| 102679 ||  || — || November 4, 1999 || Socorro || LINEAR || FLO || align=right data-sort-value="0.94" | 940 m || 
|-id=680 bgcolor=#fefefe
| 102680 ||  || — || November 4, 1999 || Socorro || LINEAR || — || align=right | 1.7 km || 
|-id=681 bgcolor=#E9E9E9
| 102681 ||  || — || November 4, 1999 || Socorro || LINEAR || — || align=right | 2.6 km || 
|-id=682 bgcolor=#fefefe
| 102682 ||  || — || November 4, 1999 || Socorro || LINEAR || FLO || align=right | 1.3 km || 
|-id=683 bgcolor=#fefefe
| 102683 ||  || — || November 4, 1999 || Socorro || LINEAR || — || align=right | 1.5 km || 
|-id=684 bgcolor=#E9E9E9
| 102684 ||  || — || November 4, 1999 || Socorro || LINEAR || — || align=right | 1.5 km || 
|-id=685 bgcolor=#fefefe
| 102685 ||  || — || November 4, 1999 || Socorro || LINEAR || V || align=right | 1.1 km || 
|-id=686 bgcolor=#fefefe
| 102686 ||  || — || November 4, 1999 || Socorro || LINEAR || FLO || align=right | 1.0 km || 
|-id=687 bgcolor=#fefefe
| 102687 ||  || — || November 4, 1999 || Socorro || LINEAR || — || align=right | 1.2 km || 
|-id=688 bgcolor=#fefefe
| 102688 ||  || — || November 12, 1999 || Xinglong || SCAP || — || align=right | 2.7 km || 
|-id=689 bgcolor=#fefefe
| 102689 ||  || — || November 12, 1999 || Socorro || LINEAR || NYS || align=right | 1.3 km || 
|-id=690 bgcolor=#fefefe
| 102690 ||  || — || November 1, 1999 || Kitt Peak || Spacewatch || V || align=right | 1.5 km || 
|-id=691 bgcolor=#fefefe
| 102691 ||  || — || November 1, 1999 || Kitt Peak || Spacewatch || NYS || align=right | 4.3 km || 
|-id=692 bgcolor=#fefefe
| 102692 ||  || — || November 1, 1999 || Kitt Peak || Spacewatch || NYS || align=right | 1.3 km || 
|-id=693 bgcolor=#fefefe
| 102693 ||  || — || November 3, 1999 || Socorro || LINEAR || NYS || align=right | 1.0 km || 
|-id=694 bgcolor=#fefefe
| 102694 ||  || — || November 3, 1999 || Socorro || LINEAR || — || align=right | 3.1 km || 
|-id=695 bgcolor=#fefefe
| 102695 ||  || — || November 3, 1999 || Socorro || LINEAR || NYS || align=right | 1.5 km || 
|-id=696 bgcolor=#fefefe
| 102696 ||  || — || November 4, 1999 || Socorro || LINEAR || NYS || align=right | 1.5 km || 
|-id=697 bgcolor=#E9E9E9
| 102697 ||  || — || November 6, 1999 || Kitt Peak || Spacewatch || — || align=right | 3.1 km || 
|-id=698 bgcolor=#d6d6d6
| 102698 ||  || — || November 5, 1999 || Catalina || CSS || ULA7:4 || align=right | 11 km || 
|-id=699 bgcolor=#fefefe
| 102699 ||  || — || November 5, 1999 || Socorro || LINEAR || — || align=right | 1.6 km || 
|-id=700 bgcolor=#fefefe
| 102700 ||  || — || November 7, 1999 || Socorro || LINEAR || — || align=right | 1.4 km || 
|}

102701–102800 

|-bgcolor=#E9E9E9
| 102701 ||  || — || November 7, 1999 || Socorro || LINEAR || EUN || align=right | 1.8 km || 
|-id=702 bgcolor=#E9E9E9
| 102702 ||  || — || November 7, 1999 || Socorro || LINEAR || — || align=right | 3.6 km || 
|-id=703 bgcolor=#fefefe
| 102703 ||  || — || November 6, 1999 || Socorro || LINEAR || PHO || align=right | 2.4 km || 
|-id=704 bgcolor=#E9E9E9
| 102704 ||  || — || November 5, 1999 || Socorro || LINEAR || — || align=right | 3.6 km || 
|-id=705 bgcolor=#fefefe
| 102705 ||  || — || November 4, 1999 || Socorro || LINEAR || — || align=right | 2.1 km || 
|-id=706 bgcolor=#E9E9E9
| 102706 ||  || — || November 5, 1999 || Socorro || LINEAR || — || align=right | 2.1 km || 
|-id=707 bgcolor=#fefefe
| 102707 ||  || — || November 5, 1999 || Socorro || LINEAR || — || align=right | 1.3 km || 
|-id=708 bgcolor=#E9E9E9
| 102708 ||  || — || November 5, 1999 || Socorro || LINEAR || — || align=right | 2.5 km || 
|-id=709 bgcolor=#E9E9E9
| 102709 ||  || — || November 5, 1999 || Socorro || LINEAR || — || align=right | 3.3 km || 
|-id=710 bgcolor=#fefefe
| 102710 ||  || — || November 5, 1999 || Socorro || LINEAR || — || align=right | 1.6 km || 
|-id=711 bgcolor=#E9E9E9
| 102711 ||  || — || November 9, 1999 || Socorro || LINEAR || — || align=right | 2.5 km || 
|-id=712 bgcolor=#fefefe
| 102712 ||  || — || November 9, 1999 || Socorro || LINEAR || MAS || align=right | 1.6 km || 
|-id=713 bgcolor=#d6d6d6
| 102713 ||  || — || November 9, 1999 || Socorro || LINEAR || KOR || align=right | 2.5 km || 
|-id=714 bgcolor=#fefefe
| 102714 ||  || — || November 9, 1999 || Socorro || LINEAR || — || align=right | 1.4 km || 
|-id=715 bgcolor=#E9E9E9
| 102715 ||  || — || November 9, 1999 || Socorro || LINEAR || — || align=right | 2.5 km || 
|-id=716 bgcolor=#fefefe
| 102716 ||  || — || November 9, 1999 || Socorro || LINEAR || — || align=right | 1.4 km || 
|-id=717 bgcolor=#fefefe
| 102717 ||  || — || November 9, 1999 || Socorro || LINEAR || NYS || align=right | 1.1 km || 
|-id=718 bgcolor=#fefefe
| 102718 ||  || — || November 9, 1999 || Socorro || LINEAR || — || align=right | 3.4 km || 
|-id=719 bgcolor=#fefefe
| 102719 ||  || — || November 9, 1999 || Socorro || LINEAR || — || align=right | 1.6 km || 
|-id=720 bgcolor=#fefefe
| 102720 ||  || — || November 9, 1999 || Socorro || LINEAR || — || align=right | 1.6 km || 
|-id=721 bgcolor=#fefefe
| 102721 ||  || — || November 9, 1999 || Socorro || LINEAR || V || align=right | 1.5 km || 
|-id=722 bgcolor=#E9E9E9
| 102722 ||  || — || November 9, 1999 || Socorro || LINEAR || — || align=right | 3.0 km || 
|-id=723 bgcolor=#fefefe
| 102723 ||  || — || November 9, 1999 || Socorro || LINEAR || — || align=right | 1.4 km || 
|-id=724 bgcolor=#E9E9E9
| 102724 ||  || — || November 9, 1999 || Socorro || LINEAR || — || align=right | 2.5 km || 
|-id=725 bgcolor=#fefefe
| 102725 ||  || — || November 9, 1999 || Socorro || LINEAR || NYS || align=right | 1.1 km || 
|-id=726 bgcolor=#fefefe
| 102726 ||  || — || November 9, 1999 || Socorro || LINEAR || MAS || align=right | 1.2 km || 
|-id=727 bgcolor=#E9E9E9
| 102727 ||  || — || November 9, 1999 || Socorro || LINEAR || — || align=right | 1.8 km || 
|-id=728 bgcolor=#E9E9E9
| 102728 ||  || — || November 9, 1999 || Socorro || LINEAR || — || align=right | 2.7 km || 
|-id=729 bgcolor=#fefefe
| 102729 ||  || — || November 9, 1999 || Socorro || LINEAR || MAS || align=right | 1.6 km || 
|-id=730 bgcolor=#E9E9E9
| 102730 ||  || — || November 9, 1999 || Socorro || LINEAR || — || align=right | 2.0 km || 
|-id=731 bgcolor=#d6d6d6
| 102731 ||  || — || November 9, 1999 || Socorro || LINEAR || — || align=right | 4.0 km || 
|-id=732 bgcolor=#fefefe
| 102732 ||  || — || November 9, 1999 || Socorro || LINEAR || — || align=right | 1.1 km || 
|-id=733 bgcolor=#fefefe
| 102733 ||  || — || November 9, 1999 || Socorro || LINEAR || V || align=right | 1.2 km || 
|-id=734 bgcolor=#d6d6d6
| 102734 ||  || — || November 9, 1999 || Socorro || LINEAR || — || align=right | 5.9 km || 
|-id=735 bgcolor=#fefefe
| 102735 ||  || — || November 9, 1999 || Socorro || LINEAR || — || align=right | 2.0 km || 
|-id=736 bgcolor=#E9E9E9
| 102736 ||  || — || November 9, 1999 || Socorro || LINEAR || — || align=right | 4.8 km || 
|-id=737 bgcolor=#fefefe
| 102737 ||  || — || November 9, 1999 || Socorro || LINEAR || FLO || align=right | 1.3 km || 
|-id=738 bgcolor=#fefefe
| 102738 ||  || — || November 9, 1999 || Socorro || LINEAR || — || align=right | 1.3 km || 
|-id=739 bgcolor=#fefefe
| 102739 ||  || — || November 9, 1999 || Socorro || LINEAR || — || align=right | 2.0 km || 
|-id=740 bgcolor=#d6d6d6
| 102740 ||  || — || November 9, 1999 || Socorro || LINEAR || — || align=right | 4.5 km || 
|-id=741 bgcolor=#fefefe
| 102741 ||  || — || November 9, 1999 || Socorro || LINEAR || NYS || align=right | 1.1 km || 
|-id=742 bgcolor=#fefefe
| 102742 ||  || — || November 9, 1999 || Socorro || LINEAR || NYS || align=right | 1.4 km || 
|-id=743 bgcolor=#E9E9E9
| 102743 ||  || — || November 9, 1999 || Socorro || LINEAR || — || align=right | 3.2 km || 
|-id=744 bgcolor=#E9E9E9
| 102744 ||  || — || November 9, 1999 || Socorro || LINEAR || — || align=right | 2.1 km || 
|-id=745 bgcolor=#E9E9E9
| 102745 ||  || — || November 9, 1999 || Socorro || LINEAR || — || align=right | 4.0 km || 
|-id=746 bgcolor=#fefefe
| 102746 ||  || — || November 9, 1999 || Socorro || LINEAR || V || align=right | 1.3 km || 
|-id=747 bgcolor=#E9E9E9
| 102747 ||  || — || November 4, 1999 || Kitt Peak || Spacewatch || — || align=right | 1.6 km || 
|-id=748 bgcolor=#d6d6d6
| 102748 ||  || — || November 9, 1999 || Kitt Peak || Spacewatch || — || align=right | 4.9 km || 
|-id=749 bgcolor=#E9E9E9
| 102749 ||  || — || November 9, 1999 || Kitt Peak || Spacewatch || EUN || align=right | 2.4 km || 
|-id=750 bgcolor=#E9E9E9
| 102750 ||  || — || November 3, 1999 || Kitt Peak || Spacewatch || — || align=right | 1.7 km || 
|-id=751 bgcolor=#fefefe
| 102751 ||  || — || November 4, 1999 || Kitt Peak || Spacewatch || V || align=right | 1.1 km || 
|-id=752 bgcolor=#fefefe
| 102752 ||  || — || November 4, 1999 || Kitt Peak || Spacewatch || V || align=right | 1.1 km || 
|-id=753 bgcolor=#fefefe
| 102753 ||  || — || November 5, 1999 || Kitt Peak || Spacewatch || V || align=right | 1.8 km || 
|-id=754 bgcolor=#fefefe
| 102754 ||  || — || November 5, 1999 || Kitt Peak || Spacewatch || — || align=right | 1.2 km || 
|-id=755 bgcolor=#fefefe
| 102755 ||  || — || November 9, 1999 || Kitt Peak || Spacewatch || NYS || align=right | 1.4 km || 
|-id=756 bgcolor=#E9E9E9
| 102756 ||  || — || November 9, 1999 || Kitt Peak || Spacewatch || — || align=right | 2.7 km || 
|-id=757 bgcolor=#fefefe
| 102757 ||  || — || November 9, 1999 || Kitt Peak || Spacewatch || MAS || align=right | 1.4 km || 
|-id=758 bgcolor=#E9E9E9
| 102758 ||  || — || November 9, 1999 || Catalina || CSS || — || align=right | 2.0 km || 
|-id=759 bgcolor=#fefefe
| 102759 ||  || — || November 9, 1999 || Catalina || CSS || — || align=right | 2.0 km || 
|-id=760 bgcolor=#fefefe
| 102760 ||  || — || November 9, 1999 || Kitt Peak || Spacewatch || MAS || align=right | 1.2 km || 
|-id=761 bgcolor=#fefefe
| 102761 ||  || — || November 10, 1999 || Kitt Peak || Spacewatch || — || align=right | 1.1 km || 
|-id=762 bgcolor=#E9E9E9
| 102762 ||  || — || November 10, 1999 || Kitt Peak || Spacewatch || — || align=right | 2.4 km || 
|-id=763 bgcolor=#fefefe
| 102763 ||  || — || November 7, 1999 || Socorro || LINEAR || — || align=right | 1.7 km || 
|-id=764 bgcolor=#fefefe
| 102764 ||  || — || November 9, 1999 || Socorro || LINEAR || V || align=right | 1.2 km || 
|-id=765 bgcolor=#E9E9E9
| 102765 ||  || — || November 9, 1999 || Socorro || LINEAR || MAR || align=right | 2.6 km || 
|-id=766 bgcolor=#fefefe
| 102766 ||  || — || November 9, 1999 || Socorro || LINEAR || — || align=right | 2.6 km || 
|-id=767 bgcolor=#fefefe
| 102767 ||  || — || November 12, 1999 || Socorro || LINEAR || — || align=right | 1.0 km || 
|-id=768 bgcolor=#E9E9E9
| 102768 ||  || — || November 9, 1999 || Kitt Peak || Spacewatch || — || align=right | 2.0 km || 
|-id=769 bgcolor=#fefefe
| 102769 ||  || — || November 10, 1999 || Kitt Peak || Spacewatch || NYS || align=right | 1.4 km || 
|-id=770 bgcolor=#E9E9E9
| 102770 ||  || — || November 10, 1999 || Kitt Peak || Spacewatch || — || align=right | 2.2 km || 
|-id=771 bgcolor=#E9E9E9
| 102771 ||  || — || November 10, 1999 || Kitt Peak || Spacewatch || — || align=right | 1.5 km || 
|-id=772 bgcolor=#fefefe
| 102772 ||  || — || November 11, 1999 || Kitt Peak || Spacewatch || NYS || align=right | 1.1 km || 
|-id=773 bgcolor=#E9E9E9
| 102773 ||  || — || November 11, 1999 || Catalina || CSS || MIS || align=right | 3.6 km || 
|-id=774 bgcolor=#E9E9E9
| 102774 ||  || — || November 11, 1999 || Catalina || CSS || — || align=right | 3.1 km || 
|-id=775 bgcolor=#d6d6d6
| 102775 ||  || — || November 13, 1999 || Catalina || CSS || ALA || align=right | 9.3 km || 
|-id=776 bgcolor=#E9E9E9
| 102776 ||  || — || November 13, 1999 || Catalina || CSS || — || align=right | 5.7 km || 
|-id=777 bgcolor=#E9E9E9
| 102777 ||  || — || November 8, 1999 || Socorro || LINEAR || EUN || align=right | 2.5 km || 
|-id=778 bgcolor=#E9E9E9
| 102778 ||  || — || November 9, 1999 || Socorro || LINEAR || — || align=right | 2.3 km || 
|-id=779 bgcolor=#fefefe
| 102779 ||  || — || November 12, 1999 || Socorro || LINEAR || — || align=right | 1.9 km || 
|-id=780 bgcolor=#fefefe
| 102780 ||  || — || November 13, 1999 || Socorro || LINEAR || — || align=right | 1.3 km || 
|-id=781 bgcolor=#E9E9E9
| 102781 ||  || — || November 14, 1999 || Socorro || LINEAR || — || align=right | 4.8 km || 
|-id=782 bgcolor=#E9E9E9
| 102782 ||  || — || November 14, 1999 || Socorro || LINEAR || WIT || align=right | 1.8 km || 
|-id=783 bgcolor=#fefefe
| 102783 ||  || — || November 14, 1999 || Socorro || LINEAR || V || align=right | 1.3 km || 
|-id=784 bgcolor=#fefefe
| 102784 ||  || — || November 9, 1999 || Kitt Peak || Spacewatch || NYS || align=right | 1.3 km || 
|-id=785 bgcolor=#fefefe
| 102785 ||  || — || November 10, 1999 || Kitt Peak || Spacewatch || — || align=right | 1.4 km || 
|-id=786 bgcolor=#fefefe
| 102786 ||  || — || November 13, 1999 || Kitt Peak || Spacewatch || NYS || align=right | 1.1 km || 
|-id=787 bgcolor=#fefefe
| 102787 ||  || — || November 12, 1999 || Kitt Peak || Spacewatch || NYS || align=right | 1.1 km || 
|-id=788 bgcolor=#fefefe
| 102788 ||  || — || November 13, 1999 || Kitt Peak || Spacewatch || V || align=right | 1.6 km || 
|-id=789 bgcolor=#fefefe
| 102789 ||  || — || November 12, 1999 || Socorro || LINEAR || — || align=right | 1.00 km || 
|-id=790 bgcolor=#fefefe
| 102790 ||  || — || November 14, 1999 || Socorro || LINEAR || NYS || align=right | 1.1 km || 
|-id=791 bgcolor=#fefefe
| 102791 ||  || — || November 14, 1999 || Socorro || LINEAR || NYS || align=right | 3.2 km || 
|-id=792 bgcolor=#fefefe
| 102792 ||  || — || November 14, 1999 || Socorro || LINEAR || V || align=right | 1.2 km || 
|-id=793 bgcolor=#fefefe
| 102793 ||  || — || November 14, 1999 || Socorro || LINEAR || NYS || align=right | 1.4 km || 
|-id=794 bgcolor=#E9E9E9
| 102794 ||  || — || November 14, 1999 || Socorro || LINEAR || JUN || align=right | 2.0 km || 
|-id=795 bgcolor=#fefefe
| 102795 ||  || — || November 14, 1999 || Socorro || LINEAR || — || align=right | 1.5 km || 
|-id=796 bgcolor=#E9E9E9
| 102796 ||  || — || November 14, 1999 || Socorro || LINEAR || MIS || align=right | 4.0 km || 
|-id=797 bgcolor=#E9E9E9
| 102797 ||  || — || November 14, 1999 || Socorro || LINEAR || — || align=right | 3.1 km || 
|-id=798 bgcolor=#fefefe
| 102798 ||  || — || November 14, 1999 || Socorro || LINEAR || V || align=right | 1.5 km || 
|-id=799 bgcolor=#E9E9E9
| 102799 ||  || — || November 14, 1999 || Socorro || LINEAR || — || align=right | 4.1 km || 
|-id=800 bgcolor=#fefefe
| 102800 ||  || — || November 14, 1999 || Socorro || LINEAR || FLO || align=right | 1.6 km || 
|}

102801–102900 

|-bgcolor=#fefefe
| 102801 ||  || — || November 14, 1999 || Socorro || LINEAR || — || align=right | 1.8 km || 
|-id=802 bgcolor=#fefefe
| 102802 ||  || — || November 14, 1999 || Socorro || LINEAR || — || align=right | 2.0 km || 
|-id=803 bgcolor=#FA8072
| 102803 ||  || — || November 14, 1999 || Socorro || LINEAR || — || align=right | 1.4 km || 
|-id=804 bgcolor=#E9E9E9
| 102804 ||  || — || November 14, 1999 || Socorro || LINEAR || — || align=right | 2.0 km || 
|-id=805 bgcolor=#E9E9E9
| 102805 ||  || — || November 14, 1999 || Socorro || LINEAR || — || align=right | 3.9 km || 
|-id=806 bgcolor=#fefefe
| 102806 ||  || — || November 14, 1999 || Socorro || LINEAR || FLO || align=right | 3.0 km || 
|-id=807 bgcolor=#E9E9E9
| 102807 ||  || — || November 14, 1999 || Socorro || LINEAR || — || align=right | 2.6 km || 
|-id=808 bgcolor=#fefefe
| 102808 ||  || — || November 14, 1999 || Socorro || LINEAR || — || align=right | 2.7 km || 
|-id=809 bgcolor=#E9E9E9
| 102809 ||  || — || November 15, 1999 || Socorro || LINEAR || — || align=right | 2.8 km || 
|-id=810 bgcolor=#E9E9E9
| 102810 ||  || — || November 10, 1999 || Anderson Mesa || LONEOS || — || align=right | 6.2 km || 
|-id=811 bgcolor=#E9E9E9
| 102811 ||  || — || November 4, 1999 || Socorro || LINEAR || — || align=right | 1.6 km || 
|-id=812 bgcolor=#E9E9E9
| 102812 ||  || — || November 4, 1999 || Socorro || LINEAR || — || align=right | 2.1 km || 
|-id=813 bgcolor=#fefefe
| 102813 ||  || — || November 5, 1999 || Socorro || LINEAR || V || align=right | 1.5 km || 
|-id=814 bgcolor=#fefefe
| 102814 ||  || — || November 5, 1999 || Socorro || LINEAR || V || align=right | 1.7 km || 
|-id=815 bgcolor=#fefefe
| 102815 ||  || — || November 5, 1999 || Socorro || LINEAR || — || align=right | 1.9 km || 
|-id=816 bgcolor=#fefefe
| 102816 ||  || — || November 6, 1999 || Socorro || LINEAR || FLO || align=right | 1.1 km || 
|-id=817 bgcolor=#E9E9E9
| 102817 ||  || — || November 5, 1999 || Socorro || LINEAR || RAF || align=right | 2.0 km || 
|-id=818 bgcolor=#fefefe
| 102818 ||  || — || November 5, 1999 || Socorro || LINEAR || V || align=right | 1.5 km || 
|-id=819 bgcolor=#E9E9E9
| 102819 ||  || — || November 9, 1999 || Socorro || LINEAR || — || align=right | 1.6 km || 
|-id=820 bgcolor=#E9E9E9
| 102820 ||  || — || November 9, 1999 || Socorro || LINEAR || — || align=right | 3.5 km || 
|-id=821 bgcolor=#fefefe
| 102821 ||  || — || November 9, 1999 || Socorro || LINEAR || — || align=right | 1.1 km || 
|-id=822 bgcolor=#fefefe
| 102822 ||  || — || November 9, 1999 || Socorro || LINEAR || CLA || align=right | 3.1 km || 
|-id=823 bgcolor=#fefefe
| 102823 ||  || — || November 9, 1999 || Socorro || LINEAR || — || align=right | 1.2 km || 
|-id=824 bgcolor=#fefefe
| 102824 ||  || — || November 9, 1999 || Socorro || LINEAR || — || align=right | 1.9 km || 
|-id=825 bgcolor=#d6d6d6
| 102825 ||  || — || November 12, 1999 || Socorro || LINEAR || — || align=right | 4.7 km || 
|-id=826 bgcolor=#fefefe
| 102826 ||  || — || November 15, 1999 || Socorro || LINEAR || MAS || align=right | 1.2 km || 
|-id=827 bgcolor=#E9E9E9
| 102827 ||  || — || November 15, 1999 || Socorro || LINEAR || — || align=right | 2.8 km || 
|-id=828 bgcolor=#fefefe
| 102828 ||  || — || November 15, 1999 || Socorro || LINEAR || — || align=right | 1.9 km || 
|-id=829 bgcolor=#fefefe
| 102829 ||  || — || November 15, 1999 || Socorro || LINEAR || — || align=right | 1.5 km || 
|-id=830 bgcolor=#fefefe
| 102830 ||  || — || November 15, 1999 || Socorro || LINEAR || FLO || align=right | 1.2 km || 
|-id=831 bgcolor=#fefefe
| 102831 ||  || — || November 15, 1999 || Socorro || LINEAR || — || align=right | 2.1 km || 
|-id=832 bgcolor=#fefefe
| 102832 ||  || — || November 15, 1999 || Socorro || LINEAR || FLO || align=right | 1.3 km || 
|-id=833 bgcolor=#E9E9E9
| 102833 ||  || — || November 15, 1999 || Socorro || LINEAR || — || align=right | 2.5 km || 
|-id=834 bgcolor=#fefefe
| 102834 ||  || — || November 15, 1999 || Socorro || LINEAR || — || align=right | 1.3 km || 
|-id=835 bgcolor=#E9E9E9
| 102835 ||  || — || November 15, 1999 || Socorro || LINEAR || — || align=right | 1.8 km || 
|-id=836 bgcolor=#d6d6d6
| 102836 ||  || — || November 12, 1999 || Socorro || LINEAR || — || align=right | 4.7 km || 
|-id=837 bgcolor=#d6d6d6
| 102837 ||  || — || November 14, 1999 || Socorro || LINEAR || EOS || align=right | 3.4 km || 
|-id=838 bgcolor=#fefefe
| 102838 ||  || — || November 1, 1999 || Anderson Mesa || LONEOS || — || align=right | 2.1 km || 
|-id=839 bgcolor=#E9E9E9
| 102839 ||  || — || November 3, 1999 || Socorro || LINEAR || — || align=right | 1.6 km || 
|-id=840 bgcolor=#E9E9E9
| 102840 ||  || — || November 1, 1999 || Catalina || CSS || — || align=right | 2.0 km || 
|-id=841 bgcolor=#fefefe
| 102841 ||  || — || November 2, 1999 || Catalina || CSS || — || align=right | 1.8 km || 
|-id=842 bgcolor=#fefefe
| 102842 ||  || — || November 1, 1999 || Catalina || CSS || — || align=right | 2.1 km || 
|-id=843 bgcolor=#d6d6d6
| 102843 ||  || — || November 3, 1999 || Catalina || CSS || — || align=right | 5.1 km || 
|-id=844 bgcolor=#fefefe
| 102844 ||  || — || November 3, 1999 || Catalina || CSS || — || align=right | 1.6 km || 
|-id=845 bgcolor=#E9E9E9
| 102845 ||  || — || November 3, 1999 || Catalina || CSS || — || align=right | 4.6 km || 
|-id=846 bgcolor=#E9E9E9
| 102846 ||  || — || November 3, 1999 || Socorro || LINEAR || — || align=right | 2.0 km || 
|-id=847 bgcolor=#d6d6d6
| 102847 ||  || — || November 5, 1999 || Socorro || LINEAR || — || align=right | 5.4 km || 
|-id=848 bgcolor=#fefefe
| 102848 ||  || — || November 9, 1999 || Anderson Mesa || LONEOS || KLI || align=right | 4.7 km || 
|-id=849 bgcolor=#E9E9E9
| 102849 ||  || — || November 13, 1999 || Catalina || CSS || MRX || align=right | 1.8 km || 
|-id=850 bgcolor=#E9E9E9
| 102850 ||  || — || November 14, 1999 || Catalina || CSS || — || align=right | 2.4 km || 
|-id=851 bgcolor=#E9E9E9
| 102851 ||  || — || November 12, 1999 || Anderson Mesa || LONEOS || — || align=right | 2.8 km || 
|-id=852 bgcolor=#fefefe
| 102852 ||  || — || November 12, 1999 || Socorro || LINEAR || ERI || align=right | 2.2 km || 
|-id=853 bgcolor=#fefefe
| 102853 ||  || — || November 5, 1999 || Socorro || LINEAR || — || align=right | 1.8 km || 
|-id=854 bgcolor=#fefefe
| 102854 ||  || — || November 3, 1999 || Socorro || LINEAR || — || align=right | 1.9 km || 
|-id=855 bgcolor=#fefefe
| 102855 ||  || — || November 5, 1999 || Socorro || LINEAR || V || align=right | 1.2 km || 
|-id=856 bgcolor=#d6d6d6
| 102856 ||  || — || November 5, 1999 || Socorro || LINEAR || — || align=right | 7.4 km || 
|-id=857 bgcolor=#fefefe
| 102857 ||  || — || November 5, 1999 || Socorro || LINEAR || — || align=right | 1.8 km || 
|-id=858 bgcolor=#E9E9E9
| 102858 ||  || — || November 5, 1999 || Socorro || LINEAR || — || align=right | 1.5 km || 
|-id=859 bgcolor=#fefefe
| 102859 ||  || — || November 28, 1999 || Kleť || Kleť Obs. || — || align=right | 1.4 km || 
|-id=860 bgcolor=#fefefe
| 102860 ||  || — || November 28, 1999 || Kleť || Kleť Obs. || — || align=right | 1.8 km || 
|-id=861 bgcolor=#fefefe
| 102861 ||  || — || November 27, 1999 || Višnjan Observatory || K. Korlević || FLO || align=right | 1.6 km || 
|-id=862 bgcolor=#E9E9E9
| 102862 ||  || — || November 27, 1999 || Višnjan Observatory || K. Korlević || — || align=right | 1.6 km || 
|-id=863 bgcolor=#E9E9E9
| 102863 ||  || — || November 28, 1999 || Oizumi || T. Kobayashi || — || align=right | 2.8 km || 
|-id=864 bgcolor=#fefefe
| 102864 ||  || — || November 28, 1999 || Oizumi || T. Kobayashi || NYS || align=right | 1.6 km || 
|-id=865 bgcolor=#E9E9E9
| 102865 ||  || — || November 28, 1999 || Oizumi || T. Kobayashi || — || align=right | 4.1 km || 
|-id=866 bgcolor=#fefefe
| 102866 ||  || — || November 28, 1999 || Oizumi || T. Kobayashi || — || align=right | 1.9 km || 
|-id=867 bgcolor=#fefefe
| 102867 ||  || — || November 30, 1999 || Kleť || Kleť Obs. || — || align=right | 1.9 km || 
|-id=868 bgcolor=#E9E9E9
| 102868 ||  || — || November 28, 1999 || Višnjan Observatory || K. Korlević || INO || align=right | 2.2 km || 
|-id=869 bgcolor=#d6d6d6
| 102869 ||  || — || November 28, 1999 || Kitt Peak || Spacewatch || — || align=right | 5.4 km || 
|-id=870 bgcolor=#fefefe
| 102870 ||  || — || November 30, 1999 || Kitt Peak || Spacewatch || — || align=right | 1.6 km || 
|-id=871 bgcolor=#fefefe
| 102871 ||  || — || November 30, 1999 || Kitt Peak || Spacewatch || NYS || align=right | 1.3 km || 
|-id=872 bgcolor=#d6d6d6
| 102872 ||  || — || November 30, 1999 || Kitt Peak || Spacewatch || — || align=right | 5.0 km || 
|-id=873 bgcolor=#FFC2E0
| 102873 ||  || — || November 30, 1999 || Kitt Peak || Spacewatch || AMO +1km || align=right | 1.1 km || 
|-id=874 bgcolor=#E9E9E9
| 102874 ||  || — || November 28, 1999 || Kitt Peak || Spacewatch || — || align=right | 3.2 km || 
|-id=875 bgcolor=#fefefe
| 102875 ||  || — || November 28, 1999 || Kitt Peak || Spacewatch || — || align=right | 1.6 km || 
|-id=876 bgcolor=#fefefe
| 102876 ||  || — || November 29, 1999 || Kitt Peak || Spacewatch || V || align=right | 1.0 km || 
|-id=877 bgcolor=#fefefe
| 102877 ||  || — || November 28, 1999 || Kitt Peak || Spacewatch || — || align=right | 1.5 km || 
|-id=878 bgcolor=#fefefe
| 102878 ||  || — || November 29, 1999 || Kitt Peak || Spacewatch || — || align=right | 1.7 km || 
|-id=879 bgcolor=#fefefe
| 102879 ||  || — || November 29, 1999 || Kitt Peak || Spacewatch || — || align=right | 1.2 km || 
|-id=880 bgcolor=#fefefe
| 102880 ||  || — || November 30, 1999 || Kitt Peak || Spacewatch || EUT || align=right | 1.3 km || 
|-id=881 bgcolor=#fefefe
| 102881 ||  || — || November 30, 1999 || Kitt Peak || Spacewatch || — || align=right | 1.4 km || 
|-id=882 bgcolor=#E9E9E9
| 102882 ||  || — || November 17, 1999 || Anderson Mesa || LONEOS || — || align=right | 2.0 km || 
|-id=883 bgcolor=#E9E9E9
| 102883 ||  || — || November 16, 1999 || Catalina || CSS || — || align=right | 2.1 km || 
|-id=884 bgcolor=#E9E9E9
| 102884 ||  || — || December 2, 1999 || Socorro || LINEAR || — || align=right | 2.0 km || 
|-id=885 bgcolor=#fefefe
| 102885 ||  || — || December 3, 1999 || Fountain Hills || C. W. Juels || ERI || align=right | 4.6 km || 
|-id=886 bgcolor=#fefefe
| 102886 ||  || — || December 4, 1999 || Catalina || CSS || — || align=right | 1.3 km || 
|-id=887 bgcolor=#fefefe
| 102887 ||  || — || December 4, 1999 || Catalina || CSS || NYS || align=right | 2.1 km || 
|-id=888 bgcolor=#fefefe
| 102888 ||  || — || December 4, 1999 || Catalina || CSS || — || align=right | 1.3 km || 
|-id=889 bgcolor=#E9E9E9
| 102889 ||  || — || December 4, 1999 || Catalina || CSS || — || align=right | 1.9 km || 
|-id=890 bgcolor=#E9E9E9
| 102890 ||  || — || December 4, 1999 || Catalina || CSS || — || align=right | 2.1 km || 
|-id=891 bgcolor=#fefefe
| 102891 ||  || — || December 4, 1999 || Catalina || CSS || NYS || align=right | 1.3 km || 
|-id=892 bgcolor=#E9E9E9
| 102892 ||  || — || December 4, 1999 || Catalina || CSS || — || align=right | 2.6 km || 
|-id=893 bgcolor=#E9E9E9
| 102893 ||  || — || December 4, 1999 || Catalina || CSS || — || align=right | 2.7 km || 
|-id=894 bgcolor=#E9E9E9
| 102894 ||  || — || December 5, 1999 || Socorro || LINEAR || — || align=right | 2.4 km || 
|-id=895 bgcolor=#E9E9E9
| 102895 ||  || — || December 5, 1999 || Kitt Peak || Spacewatch || — || align=right | 1.6 km || 
|-id=896 bgcolor=#FA8072
| 102896 ||  || — || December 5, 1999 || Kitt Peak || Spacewatch || — || align=right | 2.2 km || 
|-id=897 bgcolor=#E9E9E9
| 102897 ||  || — || December 5, 1999 || Catalina || CSS || — || align=right | 3.3 km || 
|-id=898 bgcolor=#fefefe
| 102898 ||  || — || December 5, 1999 || Catalina || CSS || V || align=right | 1.8 km || 
|-id=899 bgcolor=#fefefe
| 102899 ||  || — || December 5, 1999 || Catalina || CSS || — || align=right | 2.4 km || 
|-id=900 bgcolor=#E9E9E9
| 102900 ||  || — || December 5, 1999 || Socorro || LINEAR || — || align=right | 4.0 km || 
|}

102901–103000 

|-bgcolor=#E9E9E9
| 102901 ||  || — || December 6, 1999 || Socorro || LINEAR || HNS || align=right | 2.3 km || 
|-id=902 bgcolor=#fefefe
| 102902 ||  || — || December 6, 1999 || Socorro || LINEAR || PHO || align=right | 2.7 km || 
|-id=903 bgcolor=#E9E9E9
| 102903 ||  || — || December 5, 1999 || Višnjan Observatory || K. Korlević || — || align=right | 2.7 km || 
|-id=904 bgcolor=#fefefe
| 102904 ||  || — || December 6, 1999 || Socorro || LINEAR || — || align=right | 4.1 km || 
|-id=905 bgcolor=#fefefe
| 102905 ||  || — || December 7, 1999 || Socorro || LINEAR || — || align=right | 1.8 km || 
|-id=906 bgcolor=#fefefe
| 102906 ||  || — || December 3, 1999 || Socorro || LINEAR || NYS || align=right | 4.9 km || 
|-id=907 bgcolor=#fefefe
| 102907 ||  || — || December 3, 1999 || Socorro || LINEAR || — || align=right | 2.7 km || 
|-id=908 bgcolor=#fefefe
| 102908 ||  || — || December 5, 1999 || Socorro || LINEAR || FLO || align=right | 1.8 km || 
|-id=909 bgcolor=#fefefe
| 102909 ||  || — || December 5, 1999 || Socorro || LINEAR || V || align=right | 1.7 km || 
|-id=910 bgcolor=#FA8072
| 102910 ||  || — || December 5, 1999 || Socorro || LINEAR || — || align=right | 2.2 km || 
|-id=911 bgcolor=#fefefe
| 102911 ||  || — || December 5, 1999 || Socorro || LINEAR || NYS || align=right | 4.1 km || 
|-id=912 bgcolor=#fefefe
| 102912 ||  || — || December 5, 1999 || Socorro || LINEAR || — || align=right | 2.7 km || 
|-id=913 bgcolor=#E9E9E9
| 102913 ||  || — || December 5, 1999 || Socorro || LINEAR || — || align=right | 2.7 km || 
|-id=914 bgcolor=#fefefe
| 102914 ||  || — || December 6, 1999 || Socorro || LINEAR || NYS || align=right | 1.6 km || 
|-id=915 bgcolor=#d6d6d6
| 102915 ||  || — || December 6, 1999 || Socorro || LINEAR || 2:1J || align=right | 8.1 km || 
|-id=916 bgcolor=#fefefe
| 102916 ||  || — || December 6, 1999 || Socorro || LINEAR || PHO || align=right | 2.7 km || 
|-id=917 bgcolor=#fefefe
| 102917 ||  || — || December 12, 1999 || Socorro || LINEAR || — || align=right | 1.8 km || 
|-id=918 bgcolor=#E9E9E9
| 102918 ||  || — || December 6, 1999 || Socorro || LINEAR || — || align=right | 2.1 km || 
|-id=919 bgcolor=#fefefe
| 102919 ||  || — || December 6, 1999 || Socorro || LINEAR || — || align=right | 1.5 km || 
|-id=920 bgcolor=#fefefe
| 102920 ||  || — || December 6, 1999 || Socorro || LINEAR || — || align=right | 4.4 km || 
|-id=921 bgcolor=#E9E9E9
| 102921 ||  || — || December 6, 1999 || Socorro || LINEAR || MAR || align=right | 2.4 km || 
|-id=922 bgcolor=#fefefe
| 102922 ||  || — || December 6, 1999 || Socorro || LINEAR || — || align=right | 2.4 km || 
|-id=923 bgcolor=#E9E9E9
| 102923 ||  || — || December 6, 1999 || Socorro || LINEAR || — || align=right | 2.0 km || 
|-id=924 bgcolor=#E9E9E9
| 102924 ||  || — || December 6, 1999 || Socorro || LINEAR || — || align=right | 2.2 km || 
|-id=925 bgcolor=#E9E9E9
| 102925 ||  || — || December 6, 1999 || Socorro || LINEAR || — || align=right | 3.5 km || 
|-id=926 bgcolor=#E9E9E9
| 102926 ||  || — || December 6, 1999 || Socorro || LINEAR || — || align=right | 6.1 km || 
|-id=927 bgcolor=#fefefe
| 102927 ||  || — || December 6, 1999 || Oizumi || T. Kobayashi || NYS || align=right | 1.9 km || 
|-id=928 bgcolor=#E9E9E9
| 102928 ||  || — || December 7, 1999 || Fountain Hills || C. W. Juels || — || align=right | 3.6 km || 
|-id=929 bgcolor=#E9E9E9
| 102929 ||  || — || December 7, 1999 || Blauvac || R. Roy || — || align=right | 3.9 km || 
|-id=930 bgcolor=#fefefe
| 102930 ||  || — || December 7, 1999 || Socorro || LINEAR || NYS || align=right | 1.5 km || 
|-id=931 bgcolor=#fefefe
| 102931 ||  || — || December 7, 1999 || Socorro || LINEAR || NYS || align=right | 1.5 km || 
|-id=932 bgcolor=#fefefe
| 102932 ||  || — || December 7, 1999 || Socorro || LINEAR || NYS || align=right | 1.2 km || 
|-id=933 bgcolor=#E9E9E9
| 102933 ||  || — || December 7, 1999 || Socorro || LINEAR || — || align=right | 2.3 km || 
|-id=934 bgcolor=#E9E9E9
| 102934 ||  || — || December 7, 1999 || Socorro || LINEAR || HNS || align=right | 3.0 km || 
|-id=935 bgcolor=#FA8072
| 102935 ||  || — || December 7, 1999 || Socorro || LINEAR || — || align=right | 2.5 km || 
|-id=936 bgcolor=#E9E9E9
| 102936 ||  || — || December 7, 1999 || Socorro || LINEAR || — || align=right | 5.6 km || 
|-id=937 bgcolor=#fefefe
| 102937 ||  || — || December 7, 1999 || Socorro || LINEAR || FLO || align=right | 1.2 km || 
|-id=938 bgcolor=#fefefe
| 102938 ||  || — || December 7, 1999 || Socorro || LINEAR || NYS || align=right | 1.5 km || 
|-id=939 bgcolor=#fefefe
| 102939 ||  || — || December 7, 1999 || Socorro || LINEAR || — || align=right | 3.3 km || 
|-id=940 bgcolor=#fefefe
| 102940 ||  || — || December 7, 1999 || Socorro || LINEAR || — || align=right | 1.3 km || 
|-id=941 bgcolor=#fefefe
| 102941 ||  || — || December 7, 1999 || Socorro || LINEAR || — || align=right | 2.3 km || 
|-id=942 bgcolor=#fefefe
| 102942 ||  || — || December 7, 1999 || Socorro || LINEAR || V || align=right | 1.2 km || 
|-id=943 bgcolor=#d6d6d6
| 102943 ||  || — || December 7, 1999 || Socorro || LINEAR || — || align=right | 4.8 km || 
|-id=944 bgcolor=#E9E9E9
| 102944 ||  || — || December 7, 1999 || Socorro || LINEAR || — || align=right | 4.4 km || 
|-id=945 bgcolor=#fefefe
| 102945 ||  || — || December 7, 1999 || Socorro || LINEAR || NYS || align=right | 1.6 km || 
|-id=946 bgcolor=#E9E9E9
| 102946 ||  || — || December 7, 1999 || Socorro || LINEAR || — || align=right | 5.3 km || 
|-id=947 bgcolor=#fefefe
| 102947 ||  || — || December 7, 1999 || Socorro || LINEAR || NYS || align=right | 1.3 km || 
|-id=948 bgcolor=#fefefe
| 102948 ||  || — || December 7, 1999 || Socorro || LINEAR || — || align=right | 1.4 km || 
|-id=949 bgcolor=#E9E9E9
| 102949 ||  || — || December 7, 1999 || Socorro || LINEAR || PAD || align=right | 4.4 km || 
|-id=950 bgcolor=#fefefe
| 102950 ||  || — || December 7, 1999 || Socorro || LINEAR || V || align=right | 1.6 km || 
|-id=951 bgcolor=#E9E9E9
| 102951 ||  || — || December 7, 1999 || Socorro || LINEAR || — || align=right | 3.5 km || 
|-id=952 bgcolor=#E9E9E9
| 102952 ||  || — || December 7, 1999 || Socorro || LINEAR || MRX || align=right | 1.9 km || 
|-id=953 bgcolor=#E9E9E9
| 102953 ||  || — || December 7, 1999 || Socorro || LINEAR || — || align=right | 1.8 km || 
|-id=954 bgcolor=#fefefe
| 102954 ||  || — || December 7, 1999 || Socorro || LINEAR || — || align=right | 1.5 km || 
|-id=955 bgcolor=#E9E9E9
| 102955 ||  || — || December 7, 1999 || Socorro || LINEAR || MAR || align=right | 1.8 km || 
|-id=956 bgcolor=#E9E9E9
| 102956 ||  || — || December 7, 1999 || Socorro || LINEAR || — || align=right | 2.2 km || 
|-id=957 bgcolor=#E9E9E9
| 102957 ||  || — || December 7, 1999 || Socorro || LINEAR || — || align=right | 1.8 km || 
|-id=958 bgcolor=#fefefe
| 102958 ||  || — || December 7, 1999 || Socorro || LINEAR || V || align=right | 1.2 km || 
|-id=959 bgcolor=#fefefe
| 102959 ||  || — || December 7, 1999 || Socorro || LINEAR || MAS || align=right | 1.2 km || 
|-id=960 bgcolor=#E9E9E9
| 102960 ||  || — || December 7, 1999 || Socorro || LINEAR || — || align=right | 1.7 km || 
|-id=961 bgcolor=#fefefe
| 102961 ||  || — || December 7, 1999 || Socorro || LINEAR || MAS || align=right | 1.5 km || 
|-id=962 bgcolor=#E9E9E9
| 102962 ||  || — || December 7, 1999 || Socorro || LINEAR || — || align=right | 3.0 km || 
|-id=963 bgcolor=#fefefe
| 102963 ||  || — || December 7, 1999 || Socorro || LINEAR || — || align=right | 1.7 km || 
|-id=964 bgcolor=#E9E9E9
| 102964 ||  || — || December 7, 1999 || Socorro || LINEAR || — || align=right | 3.2 km || 
|-id=965 bgcolor=#fefefe
| 102965 ||  || — || December 7, 1999 || Socorro || LINEAR || NYS || align=right data-sort-value="0.97" | 970 m || 
|-id=966 bgcolor=#fefefe
| 102966 ||  || — || December 7, 1999 || Socorro || LINEAR || NYS || align=right | 1.3 km || 
|-id=967 bgcolor=#E9E9E9
| 102967 ||  || — || December 7, 1999 || Socorro || LINEAR || — || align=right | 1.9 km || 
|-id=968 bgcolor=#E9E9E9
| 102968 ||  || — || December 7, 1999 || Socorro || LINEAR || — || align=right | 2.9 km || 
|-id=969 bgcolor=#E9E9E9
| 102969 ||  || — || December 7, 1999 || Socorro || LINEAR || — || align=right | 2.1 km || 
|-id=970 bgcolor=#E9E9E9
| 102970 ||  || — || December 7, 1999 || Socorro || LINEAR || — || align=right | 1.6 km || 
|-id=971 bgcolor=#E9E9E9
| 102971 ||  || — || December 7, 1999 || Socorro || LINEAR || — || align=right | 3.3 km || 
|-id=972 bgcolor=#E9E9E9
| 102972 ||  || — || December 7, 1999 || Socorro || LINEAR || KON || align=right | 4.6 km || 
|-id=973 bgcolor=#E9E9E9
| 102973 ||  || — || December 7, 1999 || Socorro || LINEAR || — || align=right | 2.9 km || 
|-id=974 bgcolor=#E9E9E9
| 102974 ||  || — || December 7, 1999 || Socorro || LINEAR || — || align=right | 2.2 km || 
|-id=975 bgcolor=#fefefe
| 102975 ||  || — || December 7, 1999 || Socorro || LINEAR || — || align=right | 2.3 km || 
|-id=976 bgcolor=#fefefe
| 102976 ||  || — || December 7, 1999 || Socorro || LINEAR || FLO || align=right | 1.8 km || 
|-id=977 bgcolor=#fefefe
| 102977 ||  || — || December 7, 1999 || Socorro || LINEAR || — || align=right | 1.6 km || 
|-id=978 bgcolor=#fefefe
| 102978 ||  || — || December 7, 1999 || Socorro || LINEAR || V || align=right | 1.6 km || 
|-id=979 bgcolor=#fefefe
| 102979 ||  || — || December 7, 1999 || Socorro || LINEAR || — || align=right | 1.9 km || 
|-id=980 bgcolor=#fefefe
| 102980 ||  || — || December 7, 1999 || Socorro || LINEAR || — || align=right | 1.6 km || 
|-id=981 bgcolor=#fefefe
| 102981 ||  || — || December 7, 1999 || Socorro || LINEAR || FLO || align=right | 1.7 km || 
|-id=982 bgcolor=#fefefe
| 102982 ||  || — || December 7, 1999 || Socorro || LINEAR || — || align=right | 1.6 km || 
|-id=983 bgcolor=#E9E9E9
| 102983 ||  || — || December 7, 1999 || Socorro || LINEAR || — || align=right | 2.6 km || 
|-id=984 bgcolor=#fefefe
| 102984 ||  || — || December 7, 1999 || Socorro || LINEAR || — || align=right | 1.9 km || 
|-id=985 bgcolor=#fefefe
| 102985 ||  || — || December 7, 1999 || Socorro || LINEAR || — || align=right | 1.5 km || 
|-id=986 bgcolor=#fefefe
| 102986 ||  || — || December 7, 1999 || Socorro || LINEAR || — || align=right | 1.7 km || 
|-id=987 bgcolor=#fefefe
| 102987 ||  || — || December 7, 1999 || Socorro || LINEAR || FLO || align=right | 1.4 km || 
|-id=988 bgcolor=#E9E9E9
| 102988 ||  || — || December 7, 1999 || Socorro || LINEAR || — || align=right | 4.4 km || 
|-id=989 bgcolor=#E9E9E9
| 102989 ||  || — || December 7, 1999 || Socorro || LINEAR || JUN || align=right | 1.9 km || 
|-id=990 bgcolor=#fefefe
| 102990 ||  || — || December 7, 1999 || Socorro || LINEAR || — || align=right | 1.5 km || 
|-id=991 bgcolor=#fefefe
| 102991 ||  || — || December 7, 1999 || Socorro || LINEAR || V || align=right | 1.7 km || 
|-id=992 bgcolor=#fefefe
| 102992 ||  || — || December 7, 1999 || Socorro || LINEAR || — || align=right | 2.3 km || 
|-id=993 bgcolor=#fefefe
| 102993 ||  || — || December 7, 1999 || Socorro || LINEAR || — || align=right | 4.2 km || 
|-id=994 bgcolor=#fefefe
| 102994 ||  || — || December 7, 1999 || Socorro || LINEAR || NYS || align=right | 1.8 km || 
|-id=995 bgcolor=#fefefe
| 102995 ||  || — || December 7, 1999 || Socorro || LINEAR || V || align=right | 1.4 km || 
|-id=996 bgcolor=#E9E9E9
| 102996 ||  || — || December 7, 1999 || Socorro || LINEAR || — || align=right | 2.8 km || 
|-id=997 bgcolor=#FA8072
| 102997 ||  || — || December 7, 1999 || Socorro || LINEAR || — || align=right | 2.9 km || 
|-id=998 bgcolor=#E9E9E9
| 102998 ||  || — || December 7, 1999 || Socorro || LINEAR || EUN || align=right | 3.3 km || 
|-id=999 bgcolor=#d6d6d6
| 102999 ||  || — || December 7, 1999 || Oizumi || T. Kobayashi || — || align=right | 5.2 km || 
|-id=000 bgcolor=#E9E9E9
| 103000 ||  || — || December 9, 1999 || Oizumi || T. Kobayashi || ADE || align=right | 5.2 km || 
|}

References

External links 
 Discovery Circumstances: Numbered Minor Planets (100001)–(105000) (IAU Minor Planet Center)

0102